

329001–329100 

|-bgcolor=#fefefe
| 329001 ||  || — || August 20, 1998 || Kitt Peak || Spacewatch || V || align=right data-sort-value="0.80" | 800 m || 
|-id=002 bgcolor=#E9E9E9
| 329002 ||  || — || December 15, 2002 || Haleakala || NEAT || — || align=right | 1.4 km || 
|-id=003 bgcolor=#fefefe
| 329003 ||  || — || November 24, 2000 || Anderson Mesa || LONEOS || — || align=right data-sort-value="0.99" | 990 m || 
|-id=004 bgcolor=#E9E9E9
| 329004 ||  || — || August 4, 2005 || Palomar || NEAT || — || align=right | 1.9 km || 
|-id=005 bgcolor=#E9E9E9
| 329005 ||  || — || December 17, 2001 || Kitt Peak || Spacewatch || EUN || align=right | 1.9 km || 
|-id=006 bgcolor=#E9E9E9
| 329006 ||  || — || December 8, 2005 || Kitt Peak || Spacewatch || — || align=right | 3.3 km || 
|-id=007 bgcolor=#d6d6d6
| 329007 ||  || — || February 24, 2006 || Catalina || CSS || — || align=right | 4.4 km || 
|-id=008 bgcolor=#C2FFFF
| 329008 ||  || — || June 23, 2004 || Mauna Kea || J. Pittichová, J. Bedient || L4ERY || align=right | 7.2 km || 
|-id=009 bgcolor=#E9E9E9
| 329009 ||  || — || August 20, 2001 || Palomar || NEAT || — || align=right | 1.9 km || 
|-id=010 bgcolor=#d6d6d6
| 329010 ||  || — || October 27, 2005 || Catalina || CSS || — || align=right | 3.4 km || 
|-id=011 bgcolor=#E9E9E9
| 329011 ||  || — || January 23, 2007 || Bergisch Gladbach || W. Bickel || — || align=right | 2.1 km || 
|-id=012 bgcolor=#d6d6d6
| 329012 ||  || — || December 4, 2010 || Mount Lemmon || Mount Lemmon Survey || URS || align=right | 4.3 km || 
|-id=013 bgcolor=#fefefe
| 329013 ||  || — || April 22, 1998 || Kitt Peak || Spacewatch || V || align=right data-sort-value="0.83" | 830 m || 
|-id=014 bgcolor=#E9E9E9
| 329014 ||  || — || October 24, 2005 || Kitt Peak || Spacewatch || — || align=right | 2.0 km || 
|-id=015 bgcolor=#d6d6d6
| 329015 || 2011 AG || — || December 6, 2005 || Mount Lemmon || Mount Lemmon Survey || — || align=right | 3.1 km || 
|-id=016 bgcolor=#d6d6d6
| 329016 ||  || — || October 24, 2005 || Mauna Kea || A. Boattini || — || align=right | 3.9 km || 
|-id=017 bgcolor=#d6d6d6
| 329017 ||  || — || January 3, 2000 || Socorro || LINEAR || TIR || align=right | 4.1 km || 
|-id=018 bgcolor=#d6d6d6
| 329018 Neufeld ||  ||  || December 1, 2005 || Kitt Peak || L. H. Wasserman || EOS || align=right | 2.3 km || 
|-id=019 bgcolor=#d6d6d6
| 329019 ||  || — || August 27, 2009 || Kitt Peak || Spacewatch || — || align=right | 2.2 km || 
|-id=020 bgcolor=#E9E9E9
| 329020 ||  || — || October 26, 2005 || Kitt Peak || Spacewatch || — || align=right | 1.6 km || 
|-id=021 bgcolor=#d6d6d6
| 329021 ||  || — || October 2, 2009 || Mount Lemmon || Mount Lemmon Survey || — || align=right | 4.0 km || 
|-id=022 bgcolor=#d6d6d6
| 329022 ||  || — || January 4, 2006 || Kitt Peak || Spacewatch || EOS || align=right | 2.6 km || 
|-id=023 bgcolor=#E9E9E9
| 329023 ||  || — || January 28, 2007 || Catalina || CSS || AER || align=right | 2.1 km || 
|-id=024 bgcolor=#E9E9E9
| 329024 ||  || — || November 25, 2005 || Kitt Peak || Spacewatch || — || align=right | 2.2 km || 
|-id=025 bgcolor=#d6d6d6
| 329025 Annekathrin ||  ||  || February 16, 2001 || Cima Ekar || ADAS || — || align=right | 2.9 km || 
|-id=026 bgcolor=#d6d6d6
| 329026 ||  || — || February 2, 2000 || Kitt Peak || Spacewatch || — || align=right | 3.4 km || 
|-id=027 bgcolor=#d6d6d6
| 329027 ||  || — || October 27, 2005 || Mount Lemmon || Mount Lemmon Survey || CHA || align=right | 2.9 km || 
|-id=028 bgcolor=#d6d6d6
| 329028 ||  || — || December 6, 2010 || Mount Lemmon || Mount Lemmon Survey || — || align=right | 3.8 km || 
|-id=029 bgcolor=#fefefe
| 329029 ||  || — || October 30, 2006 || Catalina || CSS || V || align=right data-sort-value="0.75" | 750 m || 
|-id=030 bgcolor=#E9E9E9
| 329030 ||  || — || November 27, 2006 || Mount Lemmon || Mount Lemmon Survey || — || align=right | 1.1 km || 
|-id=031 bgcolor=#E9E9E9
| 329031 ||  || — || February 8, 2002 || Kitt Peak || Spacewatch || HEN || align=right | 1.2 km || 
|-id=032 bgcolor=#d6d6d6
| 329032 ||  || — || May 15, 2001 || Anderson Mesa || LONEOS || — || align=right | 4.3 km || 
|-id=033 bgcolor=#d6d6d6
| 329033 ||  || — || March 29, 2004 || Kitt Peak || Spacewatch || SHU3:2 || align=right | 5.7 km || 
|-id=034 bgcolor=#d6d6d6
| 329034 ||  || — || December 12, 2004 || Kitt Peak || Spacewatch || — || align=right | 4.4 km || 
|-id=035 bgcolor=#E9E9E9
| 329035 ||  || — || November 6, 2005 || Kitt Peak || Spacewatch || HOF || align=right | 2.2 km || 
|-id=036 bgcolor=#d6d6d6
| 329036 ||  || — || June 21, 2009 || Mount Lemmon || Mount Lemmon Survey || — || align=right | 5.0 km || 
|-id=037 bgcolor=#E9E9E9
| 329037 ||  || — || October 30, 2005 || Kitt Peak || Spacewatch || — || align=right | 2.2 km || 
|-id=038 bgcolor=#E9E9E9
| 329038 ||  || — || September 22, 1996 || Xinglong || SCAP || — || align=right | 1.8 km || 
|-id=039 bgcolor=#fefefe
| 329039 ||  || — || November 22, 2006 || Mount Lemmon || Mount Lemmon Survey || — || align=right | 1.2 km || 
|-id=040 bgcolor=#E9E9E9
| 329040 ||  || — || March 11, 2007 || Kitt Peak || Spacewatch || HOF || align=right | 3.0 km || 
|-id=041 bgcolor=#d6d6d6
| 329041 ||  || — || March 4, 2006 || Kitt Peak || Spacewatch || — || align=right | 2.8 km || 
|-id=042 bgcolor=#d6d6d6
| 329042 ||  || — || April 26, 2007 || Mount Lemmon || Mount Lemmon Survey || — || align=right | 3.4 km || 
|-id=043 bgcolor=#d6d6d6
| 329043 ||  || — || January 7, 2000 || Kitt Peak || Spacewatch || — || align=right | 3.4 km || 
|-id=044 bgcolor=#fefefe
| 329044 ||  || — || December 24, 2006 || Kitt Peak || Spacewatch || MAS || align=right data-sort-value="0.86" | 860 m || 
|-id=045 bgcolor=#d6d6d6
| 329045 ||  || — || April 25, 2007 || Mount Lemmon || Mount Lemmon Survey || — || align=right | 3.3 km || 
|-id=046 bgcolor=#E9E9E9
| 329046 ||  || — || August 25, 2004 || Kitt Peak || Spacewatch || — || align=right | 2.2 km || 
|-id=047 bgcolor=#E9E9E9
| 329047 ||  || — || March 16, 2007 || Kitt Peak || Spacewatch || WIT || align=right | 1.0 km || 
|-id=048 bgcolor=#E9E9E9
| 329048 ||  || — || March 26, 2003 || Kitt Peak || Spacewatch || — || align=right | 1.5 km || 
|-id=049 bgcolor=#E9E9E9
| 329049 ||  || — || January 29, 2003 || Palomar || NEAT || — || align=right | 1.5 km || 
|-id=050 bgcolor=#d6d6d6
| 329050 ||  || — || March 29, 2006 || Socorro || LINEAR || TIR || align=right | 4.5 km || 
|-id=051 bgcolor=#d6d6d6
| 329051 ||  || — || December 6, 2010 || Mount Lemmon || Mount Lemmon Survey || HYG || align=right | 3.0 km || 
|-id=052 bgcolor=#d6d6d6
| 329052 ||  || — || December 18, 2004 || Mount Lemmon || Mount Lemmon Survey || THM || align=right | 2.3 km || 
|-id=053 bgcolor=#E9E9E9
| 329053 ||  || — || November 5, 2005 || Kitt Peak || Spacewatch || — || align=right | 1.8 km || 
|-id=054 bgcolor=#d6d6d6
| 329054 ||  || — || February 1, 2006 || Kitt Peak || Spacewatch || — || align=right | 2.3 km || 
|-id=055 bgcolor=#E9E9E9
| 329055 ||  || — || March 11, 2007 || Kitt Peak || Spacewatch || WIT || align=right | 1.5 km || 
|-id=056 bgcolor=#E9E9E9
| 329056 ||  || — || December 27, 2006 || Mount Lemmon || Mount Lemmon Survey || — || align=right | 3.0 km || 
|-id=057 bgcolor=#fefefe
| 329057 ||  || — || February 18, 2008 || Mount Lemmon || Mount Lemmon Survey || FLO || align=right data-sort-value="0.91" | 910 m || 
|-id=058 bgcolor=#d6d6d6
| 329058 ||  || — || January 28, 2000 || Kitt Peak || Spacewatch || — || align=right | 2.5 km || 
|-id=059 bgcolor=#d6d6d6
| 329059 ||  || — || September 24, 2009 || Catalina || CSS || — || align=right | 3.3 km || 
|-id=060 bgcolor=#d6d6d6
| 329060 ||  || — || December 5, 2005 || Kitt Peak || Spacewatch || — || align=right | 2.9 km || 
|-id=061 bgcolor=#d6d6d6
| 329061 ||  || — || March 19, 2001 || Apache Point || SDSS || — || align=right | 3.0 km || 
|-id=062 bgcolor=#E9E9E9
| 329062 ||  || — || October 25, 1997 || Kitt Peak || Spacewatch || — || align=right | 1.7 km || 
|-id=063 bgcolor=#E9E9E9
| 329063 ||  || — || November 1, 2005 || Mount Lemmon || Mount Lemmon Survey || AGN || align=right | 1.4 km || 
|-id=064 bgcolor=#E9E9E9
| 329064 ||  || — || April 28, 2008 || Mount Lemmon || Mount Lemmon Survey || — || align=right | 2.1 km || 
|-id=065 bgcolor=#d6d6d6
| 329065 ||  || — || September 22, 2009 || Mount Lemmon || Mount Lemmon Survey || SHU3:2 || align=right | 5.7 km || 
|-id=066 bgcolor=#E9E9E9
| 329066 ||  || — || October 28, 2005 || Kitt Peak || Spacewatch || — || align=right | 1.3 km || 
|-id=067 bgcolor=#E9E9E9
| 329067 ||  || — || September 19, 2009 || Kitt Peak || Spacewatch || MRX || align=right | 1.4 km || 
|-id=068 bgcolor=#E9E9E9
| 329068 ||  || — || February 10, 2002 || Socorro || LINEAR || GEF || align=right | 1.6 km || 
|-id=069 bgcolor=#E9E9E9
| 329069 Russellporter ||  ||  || October 20, 2006 || Kitt Peak || L. H. Wasserman || — || align=right | 1.1 km || 
|-id=070 bgcolor=#d6d6d6
| 329070 ||  || — || January 10, 2000 || Kitt Peak || Spacewatch || HYG || align=right | 3.1 km || 
|-id=071 bgcolor=#d6d6d6
| 329071 ||  || — || January 31, 2006 || Kitt Peak || Spacewatch || THM || align=right | 2.5 km || 
|-id=072 bgcolor=#d6d6d6
| 329072 ||  || — || January 26, 2006 || Kitt Peak || Spacewatch || — || align=right | 3.1 km || 
|-id=073 bgcolor=#d6d6d6
| 329073 ||  || — || February 6, 2006 || Mount Lemmon || Mount Lemmon Survey || — || align=right | 3.3 km || 
|-id=074 bgcolor=#d6d6d6
| 329074 ||  || — || September 28, 2003 || Anderson Mesa || LONEOS || — || align=right | 4.6 km || 
|-id=075 bgcolor=#d6d6d6
| 329075 ||  || — || February 6, 2006 || Catalina || CSS || — || align=right | 3.8 km || 
|-id=076 bgcolor=#d6d6d6
| 329076 ||  || — || March 4, 2006 || Kitt Peak || Spacewatch || HYG || align=right | 3.0 km || 
|-id=077 bgcolor=#E9E9E9
| 329077 ||  || — || March 11, 2007 || Catalina || CSS || — || align=right | 3.3 km || 
|-id=078 bgcolor=#d6d6d6
| 329078 ||  || — || August 7, 2008 || Kitt Peak || Spacewatch || EOS || align=right | 2.7 km || 
|-id=079 bgcolor=#E9E9E9
| 329079 ||  || — || April 3, 2008 || Mount Lemmon || Mount Lemmon Survey || — || align=right | 1.2 km || 
|-id=080 bgcolor=#d6d6d6
| 329080 ||  || — || May 13, 2007 || Mount Lemmon || Mount Lemmon Survey || EOS || align=right | 2.5 km || 
|-id=081 bgcolor=#d6d6d6
| 329081 ||  || — || November 27, 2009 || Mount Lemmon || Mount Lemmon Survey || 7:4 || align=right | 5.1 km || 
|-id=082 bgcolor=#d6d6d6
| 329082 ||  || — || February 18, 2010 || WISE || WISE || — || align=right | 3.6 km || 
|-id=083 bgcolor=#E9E9E9
| 329083 ||  || — || November 4, 2005 || Mount Lemmon || Mount Lemmon Survey || WIT || align=right data-sort-value="0.95" | 950 m || 
|-id=084 bgcolor=#d6d6d6
| 329084 ||  || — || February 23, 2006 || Anderson Mesa || LONEOS || — || align=right | 4.3 km || 
|-id=085 bgcolor=#d6d6d6
| 329085 ||  || — || May 2, 2006 || Mount Lemmon || Mount Lemmon Survey || SYL7:4 || align=right | 4.9 km || 
|-id=086 bgcolor=#d6d6d6
| 329086 ||  || — || October 24, 2005 || Mauna Kea || A. Boattini || — || align=right | 3.4 km || 
|-id=087 bgcolor=#d6d6d6
| 329087 ||  || — || May 30, 1997 || Kitt Peak || Spacewatch || — || align=right | 3.3 km || 
|-id=088 bgcolor=#d6d6d6
| 329088 ||  || — || October 6, 2005 || Mount Lemmon || Mount Lemmon Survey || EOS || align=right | 2.2 km || 
|-id=089 bgcolor=#E9E9E9
| 329089 ||  || — || February 21, 2007 || Mount Lemmon || Mount Lemmon Survey || — || align=right | 1.8 km || 
|-id=090 bgcolor=#d6d6d6
| 329090 ||  || — || February 3, 2006 || Mount Lemmon || Mount Lemmon Survey || — || align=right | 4.5 km || 
|-id=091 bgcolor=#d6d6d6
| 329091 ||  || — || January 23, 2006 || Kitt Peak || Spacewatch || EOS || align=right | 2.1 km || 
|-id=092 bgcolor=#E9E9E9
| 329092 ||  || — || February 2, 1997 || Kitt Peak || Spacewatch || — || align=right | 2.4 km || 
|-id=093 bgcolor=#d6d6d6
| 329093 ||  || — || September 19, 1998 || Apache Point || SDSS || — || align=right | 3.7 km || 
|-id=094 bgcolor=#d6d6d6
| 329094 ||  || — || July 14, 2007 || Antares || ARO || — || align=right | 4.0 km || 
|-id=095 bgcolor=#d6d6d6
| 329095 ||  || — || October 20, 2003 || Kitt Peak || Spacewatch || — || align=right | 3.7 km || 
|-id=096 bgcolor=#d6d6d6
| 329096 ||  || — || October 7, 2004 || Kitt Peak || Spacewatch || THM || align=right | 2.2 km || 
|-id=097 bgcolor=#E9E9E9
| 329097 ||  || — || October 25, 2005 || Kitt Peak || Spacewatch || — || align=right | 1.5 km || 
|-id=098 bgcolor=#E9E9E9
| 329098 ||  || — || November 15, 2001 || Kitt Peak || Spacewatch || — || align=right | 1.7 km || 
|-id=099 bgcolor=#d6d6d6
| 329099 ||  || — || October 1, 2009 || Mount Lemmon || Mount Lemmon Survey || — || align=right | 2.7 km || 
|-id=100 bgcolor=#d6d6d6
| 329100 ||  || — || April 24, 2001 || Kitt Peak || Spacewatch || THM || align=right | 2.0 km || 
|}

329101–329200 

|-bgcolor=#d6d6d6
| 329101 ||  || — || March 26, 2006 || Mount Lemmon || Mount Lemmon Survey || — || align=right | 2.8 km || 
|-id=102 bgcolor=#E9E9E9
| 329102 ||  || — || November 30, 2005 || Kitt Peak || Spacewatch || — || align=right | 2.0 km || 
|-id=103 bgcolor=#d6d6d6
| 329103 ||  || — || February 25, 2006 || Kitt Peak || Spacewatch || — || align=right | 3.1 km || 
|-id=104 bgcolor=#d6d6d6
| 329104 ||  || — || March 15, 2007 || Kitt Peak || Spacewatch || — || align=right | 3.1 km || 
|-id=105 bgcolor=#d6d6d6
| 329105 ||  || — || October 14, 2009 || Catalina || CSS || — || align=right | 4.9 km || 
|-id=106 bgcolor=#d6d6d6
| 329106 ||  || — || October 22, 2003 || Apache Point || SDSS || EOS || align=right | 2.1 km || 
|-id=107 bgcolor=#d6d6d6
| 329107 ||  || — || September 21, 2003 || Kitt Peak || Spacewatch || HYG || align=right | 3.2 km || 
|-id=108 bgcolor=#E9E9E9
| 329108 ||  || — || July 30, 2008 || Mount Lemmon || Mount Lemmon Survey || — || align=right | 2.3 km || 
|-id=109 bgcolor=#d6d6d6
| 329109 ||  || — || March 3, 2006 || Kitt Peak || Spacewatch || — || align=right | 2.7 km || 
|-id=110 bgcolor=#d6d6d6
| 329110 ||  || — || May 17, 2007 || Catalina || CSS || — || align=right | 3.9 km || 
|-id=111 bgcolor=#d6d6d6
| 329111 ||  || — || January 31, 2006 || Kitt Peak || Spacewatch || — || align=right | 3.0 km || 
|-id=112 bgcolor=#d6d6d6
| 329112 ||  || — || January 23, 2006 || Kitt Peak || Spacewatch || — || align=right | 3.0 km || 
|-id=113 bgcolor=#d6d6d6
| 329113 ||  || — || April 21, 2004 || Kitt Peak || Spacewatch || 3:2 || align=right | 5.2 km || 
|-id=114 bgcolor=#E9E9E9
| 329114 ||  || — || January 10, 2007 || Mount Lemmon || Mount Lemmon Survey || — || align=right | 1.0 km || 
|-id=115 bgcolor=#d6d6d6
| 329115 ||  || — || February 27, 2006 || Kitt Peak || Spacewatch || — || align=right | 3.0 km || 
|-id=116 bgcolor=#d6d6d6
| 329116 ||  || — || August 6, 2008 || Siding Spring || SSS || EOS || align=right | 2.8 km || 
|-id=117 bgcolor=#d6d6d6
| 329117 ||  || — || October 2, 2003 || Kitt Peak || Spacewatch || — || align=right | 3.9 km || 
|-id=118 bgcolor=#E9E9E9
| 329118 ||  || — || December 24, 2005 || Kitt Peak || Spacewatch || — || align=right | 2.5 km || 
|-id=119 bgcolor=#d6d6d6
| 329119 ||  || — || January 8, 2006 || Mount Lemmon || Mount Lemmon Survey || NAE || align=right | 2.4 km || 
|-id=120 bgcolor=#E9E9E9
| 329120 ||  || — || March 26, 2007 || Mount Lemmon || Mount Lemmon Survey || HOF || align=right | 2.5 km || 
|-id=121 bgcolor=#d6d6d6
| 329121 ||  || — || December 5, 2005 || Kitt Peak || Spacewatch || — || align=right | 3.6 km || 
|-id=122 bgcolor=#d6d6d6
| 329122 ||  || — || June 21, 2007 || Mount Lemmon || Mount Lemmon Survey || 7:4 || align=right | 5.5 km || 
|-id=123 bgcolor=#d6d6d6
| 329123 ||  || — || January 31, 2006 || Kitt Peak || Spacewatch || — || align=right | 2.8 km || 
|-id=124 bgcolor=#d6d6d6
| 329124 ||  || — || August 30, 2002 || Kitt Peak || Spacewatch || — || align=right | 2.9 km || 
|-id=125 bgcolor=#d6d6d6
| 329125 ||  || — || April 7, 2006 || Kitt Peak || Spacewatch || — || align=right | 4.1 km || 
|-id=126 bgcolor=#E9E9E9
| 329126 ||  || — || September 17, 2009 || Kitt Peak || Spacewatch || — || align=right | 1.7 km || 
|-id=127 bgcolor=#d6d6d6
| 329127 ||  || — || March 3, 2006 || Catalina || CSS || — || align=right | 4.6 km || 
|-id=128 bgcolor=#d6d6d6
| 329128 ||  || — || March 27, 2001 || Kitt Peak || Spacewatch || — || align=right | 3.0 km || 
|-id=129 bgcolor=#d6d6d6
| 329129 ||  || — || October 25, 2009 || Mount Lemmon || Mount Lemmon Survey || — || align=right | 4.5 km || 
|-id=130 bgcolor=#d6d6d6
| 329130 ||  || — || July 24, 2003 || Palomar || NEAT || — || align=right | 4.1 km || 
|-id=131 bgcolor=#fefefe
| 329131 ||  || — || December 26, 2006 || Catalina || CSS || — || align=right | 1.5 km || 
|-id=132 bgcolor=#d6d6d6
| 329132 ||  || — || March 10, 2000 || Socorro || LINEAR || — || align=right | 4.2 km || 
|-id=133 bgcolor=#d6d6d6
| 329133 ||  || — || February 27, 2006 || Kitt Peak || Spacewatch || — || align=right | 3.1 km || 
|-id=134 bgcolor=#d6d6d6
| 329134 ||  || — || January 26, 2006 || Kitt Peak || Spacewatch || — || align=right | 3.9 km || 
|-id=135 bgcolor=#d6d6d6
| 329135 ||  || — || October 24, 2009 || Kitt Peak || Spacewatch || — || align=right | 2.3 km || 
|-id=136 bgcolor=#d6d6d6
| 329136 ||  || — || November 26, 1998 || Kitt Peak || Spacewatch || — || align=right | 3.8 km || 
|-id=137 bgcolor=#E9E9E9
| 329137 ||  || — || August 9, 2004 || Socorro || LINEAR || — || align=right | 2.8 km || 
|-id=138 bgcolor=#d6d6d6
| 329138 ||  || — || August 23, 2008 || Kitt Peak || Spacewatch || HYG || align=right | 3.1 km || 
|-id=139 bgcolor=#d6d6d6
| 329139 ||  || — || August 16, 2002 || Haleakala || NEAT || — || align=right | 4.4 km || 
|-id=140 bgcolor=#d6d6d6
| 329140 ||  || — || February 9, 2005 || Mount Lemmon || Mount Lemmon Survey || — || align=right | 3.6 km || 
|-id=141 bgcolor=#d6d6d6
| 329141 ||  || — || January 30, 2000 || Kitt Peak || Spacewatch || EOS || align=right | 2.3 km || 
|-id=142 bgcolor=#d6d6d6
| 329142 ||  || — || October 8, 2008 || Catalina || CSS || EOS || align=right | 2.8 km || 
|-id=143 bgcolor=#d6d6d6
| 329143 ||  || — || January 16, 2005 || Kitt Peak || Spacewatch || — || align=right | 4.6 km || 
|-id=144 bgcolor=#FA8072
| 329144 ||  || — || June 15, 2004 || Kitt Peak || Spacewatch || — || align=right | 3.3 km || 
|-id=145 bgcolor=#d6d6d6
| 329145 ||  || — || April 20, 2007 || Kitt Peak || Spacewatch || SYL7:4 || align=right | 6.2 km || 
|-id=146 bgcolor=#d6d6d6
| 329146 ||  || — || September 7, 2004 || Palomar || NEAT || EOS || align=right | 2.8 km || 
|-id=147 bgcolor=#E9E9E9
| 329147 ||  || — || August 31, 2002 || Kitt Peak || Spacewatch || — || align=right data-sort-value="0.88" | 880 m || 
|-id=148 bgcolor=#d6d6d6
| 329148 ||  || — || February 24, 2006 || Mount Lemmon || Mount Lemmon Survey || — || align=right | 5.9 km || 
|-id=149 bgcolor=#d6d6d6
| 329149 ||  || — || January 28, 2007 || Mount Lemmon || Mount Lemmon Survey || — || align=right | 3.1 km || 
|-id=150 bgcolor=#C2FFFF
| 329150 ||  || — || September 25, 2008 || Mount Lemmon || Mount Lemmon Survey || L4 || align=right | 9.8 km || 
|-id=151 bgcolor=#d6d6d6
| 329151 ||  || — || July 8, 2003 || Palomar || NEAT || — || align=right | 5.3 km || 
|-id=152 bgcolor=#E9E9E9
| 329152 ||  || — || December 22, 2003 || Kitt Peak || Spacewatch || — || align=right data-sort-value="0.82" | 820 m || 
|-id=153 bgcolor=#d6d6d6
| 329153 ||  || — || April 11, 2002 || Palomar || NEAT || URS || align=right | 5.0 km || 
|-id=154 bgcolor=#E9E9E9
| 329154 ||  || — || January 9, 1999 || Kitt Peak || Spacewatch || — || align=right | 1.9 km || 
|-id=155 bgcolor=#d6d6d6
| 329155 ||  || — || July 26, 2010 || WISE || WISE || — || align=right | 6.6 km || 
|-id=156 bgcolor=#d6d6d6
| 329156 ||  || — || September 10, 2004 || Kitt Peak || Spacewatch || — || align=right | 3.5 km || 
|-id=157 bgcolor=#E9E9E9
| 329157 ||  || — || February 9, 2003 || Palomar || NEAT || NEM || align=right | 2.7 km || 
|-id=158 bgcolor=#d6d6d6
| 329158 ||  || — || February 2, 2001 || Kitt Peak || Spacewatch || — || align=right | 4.4 km || 
|-id=159 bgcolor=#fefefe
| 329159 ||  || — || November 16, 2003 || Kitt Peak || Spacewatch || MAS || align=right data-sort-value="0.93" | 930 m || 
|-id=160 bgcolor=#d6d6d6
| 329160 ||  || — || March 20, 2007 || Catalina || CSS || — || align=right | 4.6 km || 
|-id=161 bgcolor=#E9E9E9
| 329161 ||  || — || March 24, 2003 || Kitt Peak || Spacewatch || NEM || align=right | 2.7 km || 
|-id=162 bgcolor=#d6d6d6
| 329162 ||  || — || January 4, 2001 || Haleakala || NEAT || EOS || align=right | 2.5 km || 
|-id=163 bgcolor=#fefefe
| 329163 ||  || — || February 2, 2005 || Catalina || CSS || FLO || align=right data-sort-value="0.53" | 530 m || 
|-id=164 bgcolor=#E9E9E9
| 329164 ||  || — || June 22, 2004 || Siding Spring || SSS || BAR || align=right | 2.0 km || 
|-id=165 bgcolor=#d6d6d6
| 329165 ||  || — || September 13, 2005 || Kitt Peak || Spacewatch || — || align=right | 2.0 km || 
|-id=166 bgcolor=#E9E9E9
| 329166 ||  || — || April 15, 1994 || Kitt Peak || Spacewatch || — || align=right | 2.5 km || 
|-id=167 bgcolor=#E9E9E9
| 329167 ||  || — || December 14, 2006 || Kitt Peak || Spacewatch || HNA || align=right | 2.1 km || 
|-id=168 bgcolor=#d6d6d6
| 329168 ||  || — || March 9, 2007 || Mount Lemmon || Mount Lemmon Survey || HYG || align=right | 3.1 km || 
|-id=169 bgcolor=#E9E9E9
| 329169 ||  || — || October 17, 2001 || Kitt Peak || Spacewatch || — || align=right | 1.9 km || 
|-id=170 bgcolor=#E9E9E9
| 329170 ||  || — || September 25, 2005 || Kitt Peak || Spacewatch || — || align=right | 2.8 km || 
|-id=171 bgcolor=#d6d6d6
| 329171 ||  || — || September 16, 2003 || Kitt Peak || Spacewatch || — || align=right | 4.5 km || 
|-id=172 bgcolor=#d6d6d6
| 329172 ||  || — || March 2, 2001 || Anderson Mesa || LONEOS || TIR || align=right | 4.2 km || 
|-id=173 bgcolor=#E9E9E9
| 329173 ||  || — || September 26, 2006 || Kitt Peak || Spacewatch || BAR || align=right | 1.2 km || 
|-id=174 bgcolor=#E9E9E9
| 329174 ||  || — || December 10, 2001 || Kitt Peak || Spacewatch || — || align=right | 3.4 km || 
|-id=175 bgcolor=#E9E9E9
| 329175 ||  || — || April 4, 2003 || Anderson Mesa || LONEOS || — || align=right | 3.2 km || 
|-id=176 bgcolor=#fefefe
| 329176 ||  || — || October 19, 2006 || Mount Lemmon || Mount Lemmon Survey || — || align=right | 1.1 km || 
|-id=177 bgcolor=#fefefe
| 329177 ||  || — || September 18, 2003 || Palomar || NEAT || — || align=right data-sort-value="0.89" | 890 m || 
|-id=178 bgcolor=#fefefe
| 329178 ||  || — || February 16, 2001 || Kitt Peak || Spacewatch || MAS || align=right data-sort-value="0.73" | 730 m || 
|-id=179 bgcolor=#E9E9E9
| 329179 ||  || — || August 28, 2009 || Kitt Peak || Spacewatch || — || align=right | 3.6 km || 
|-id=180 bgcolor=#d6d6d6
| 329180 ||  || — || January 22, 2006 || Mount Lemmon || Mount Lemmon Survey || — || align=right | 3.4 km || 
|-id=181 bgcolor=#E9E9E9
| 329181 ||  || — || October 8, 2005 || Kitt Peak || Spacewatch || MRX || align=right | 1.00 km || 
|-id=182 bgcolor=#d6d6d6
| 329182 ||  || — || September 18, 2003 || Palomar || NEAT || — || align=right | 5.2 km || 
|-id=183 bgcolor=#fefefe
| 329183 ||  || — || March 15, 2001 || Kitt Peak || Spacewatch || — || align=right | 1.0 km || 
|-id=184 bgcolor=#E9E9E9
| 329184 ||  || — || March 12, 2008 || Kitt Peak || Spacewatch || RAF || align=right data-sort-value="0.98" | 980 m || 
|-id=185 bgcolor=#fefefe
| 329185 ||  || — || November 21, 2003 || Kitt Peak || Spacewatch || V || align=right data-sort-value="0.83" | 830 m || 
|-id=186 bgcolor=#fefefe
| 329186 ||  || — || April 9, 2005 || Mount Lemmon || Mount Lemmon Survey || — || align=right data-sort-value="0.85" | 850 m || 
|-id=187 bgcolor=#d6d6d6
| 329187 ||  || — || March 10, 2007 || Mount Lemmon || Mount Lemmon Survey || KOR || align=right | 2.1 km || 
|-id=188 bgcolor=#E9E9E9
| 329188 ||  || — || April 24, 2003 || Haleakala || NEAT || — || align=right | 2.7 km || 
|-id=189 bgcolor=#d6d6d6
| 329189 ||  || — || January 23, 2006 || Kitt Peak || Spacewatch || — || align=right | 4.1 km || 
|-id=190 bgcolor=#d6d6d6
| 329190 ||  || — || February 3, 2006 || Mount Lemmon || Mount Lemmon Survey || — || align=right | 4.0 km || 
|-id=191 bgcolor=#E9E9E9
| 329191 ||  || — || September 16, 2009 || Mount Lemmon || Mount Lemmon Survey || — || align=right | 2.7 km || 
|-id=192 bgcolor=#fefefe
| 329192 ||  || — || September 8, 2007 || Mount Lemmon || Mount Lemmon Survey || FLO || align=right data-sort-value="0.53" | 530 m || 
|-id=193 bgcolor=#d6d6d6
| 329193 ||  || — || September 11, 2004 || Kitt Peak || Spacewatch || KOR || align=right | 2.0 km || 
|-id=194 bgcolor=#fefefe
| 329194 ||  || — || November 5, 2007 || Mount Lemmon || Mount Lemmon Survey || MAS || align=right data-sort-value="0.71" | 710 m || 
|-id=195 bgcolor=#fefefe
| 329195 ||  || — || September 18, 1995 || Kitt Peak || Spacewatch || MAS || align=right data-sort-value="0.81" | 810 m || 
|-id=196 bgcolor=#E9E9E9
| 329196 ||  || — || October 1, 2005 || Mount Lemmon || Mount Lemmon Survey || CLO || align=right | 2.5 km || 
|-id=197 bgcolor=#fefefe
| 329197 ||  || — || January 3, 2000 || Kitt Peak || Spacewatch || NYS || align=right data-sort-value="0.62" | 620 m || 
|-id=198 bgcolor=#fefefe
| 329198 ||  || — || September 27, 2003 || Kitt Peak || Spacewatch || NYS || align=right data-sort-value="0.60" | 600 m || 
|-id=199 bgcolor=#fefefe
| 329199 ||  || — || April 1, 2005 || Kitt Peak || Spacewatch || — || align=right | 1.00 km || 
|-id=200 bgcolor=#E9E9E9
| 329200 ||  || — || December 27, 2006 || Mount Lemmon || Mount Lemmon Survey || — || align=right | 2.4 km || 
|}

329201–329300 

|-bgcolor=#fefefe
| 329201 ||  || — || March 10, 2005 || Kitt Peak || Spacewatch || V || align=right data-sort-value="0.68" | 680 m || 
|-id=202 bgcolor=#E9E9E9
| 329202 ||  || — || March 11, 2003 || Kitt Peak || Spacewatch || — || align=right | 2.4 km || 
|-id=203 bgcolor=#fefefe
| 329203 ||  || — || May 18, 2006 || Palomar || NEAT || — || align=right data-sort-value="0.85" | 850 m || 
|-id=204 bgcolor=#d6d6d6
| 329204 ||  || — || January 7, 2006 || Socorro || LINEAR || — || align=right | 3.8 km || 
|-id=205 bgcolor=#d6d6d6
| 329205 ||  || — || September 21, 2003 || Kitt Peak || Spacewatch || — || align=right | 3.3 km || 
|-id=206 bgcolor=#fefefe
| 329206 ||  || — || January 4, 2000 || Kitt Peak || Spacewatch || NYS || align=right data-sort-value="0.92" | 920 m || 
|-id=207 bgcolor=#d6d6d6
| 329207 ||  || — || October 7, 2004 || Kitt Peak || Spacewatch || — || align=right | 2.5 km || 
|-id=208 bgcolor=#d6d6d6
| 329208 ||  || — || March 18, 2001 || Socorro || LINEAR || TIR || align=right | 3.4 km || 
|-id=209 bgcolor=#fefefe
| 329209 ||  || — || September 17, 2003 || Kitt Peak || Spacewatch || FLO || align=right data-sort-value="0.66" | 660 m || 
|-id=210 bgcolor=#d6d6d6
| 329210 ||  || — || March 2, 2001 || Socorro || LINEAR || — || align=right | 4.5 km || 
|-id=211 bgcolor=#fefefe
| 329211 ||  || — || March 4, 2005 || Mount Lemmon || Mount Lemmon Survey || — || align=right data-sort-value="0.94" | 940 m || 
|-id=212 bgcolor=#d6d6d6
| 329212 ||  || — || September 16, 2003 || Kitt Peak || Spacewatch || — || align=right | 3.9 km || 
|-id=213 bgcolor=#fefefe
| 329213 ||  || — || April 24, 2001 || Kitt Peak || Spacewatch || EUT || align=right data-sort-value="0.69" | 690 m || 
|-id=214 bgcolor=#d6d6d6
| 329214 ||  || — || September 27, 2003 || Kitt Peak || Spacewatch || — || align=right | 3.3 km || 
|-id=215 bgcolor=#fefefe
| 329215 ||  || — || March 8, 2005 || Anderson Mesa || LONEOS || — || align=right data-sort-value="0.96" | 960 m || 
|-id=216 bgcolor=#E9E9E9
| 329216 ||  || — || November 16, 2006 || Kitt Peak || Spacewatch || — || align=right | 1.1 km || 
|-id=217 bgcolor=#fefefe
| 329217 ||  || — || January 13, 2008 || Kitt Peak || Spacewatch || — || align=right | 1.1 km || 
|-id=218 bgcolor=#fefefe
| 329218 ||  || — || October 1, 2003 || Kitt Peak || Spacewatch || — || align=right data-sort-value="0.98" | 980 m || 
|-id=219 bgcolor=#E9E9E9
| 329219 ||  || — || February 6, 2003 || Kitt Peak || Spacewatch || — || align=right | 2.5 km || 
|-id=220 bgcolor=#E9E9E9
| 329220 ||  || — || October 27, 2005 || Kitt Peak || Spacewatch || — || align=right | 2.6 km || 
|-id=221 bgcolor=#E9E9E9
| 329221 ||  || — || January 17, 2007 || Kitt Peak || Spacewatch || — || align=right | 1.5 km || 
|-id=222 bgcolor=#fefefe
| 329222 ||  || — || March 20, 2001 || Anderson Mesa || LONEOS || — || align=right | 1.0 km || 
|-id=223 bgcolor=#fefefe
| 329223 ||  || — || April 28, 1995 || Kitt Peak || Spacewatch || — || align=right data-sort-value="0.94" | 940 m || 
|-id=224 bgcolor=#d6d6d6
| 329224 ||  || — || February 22, 2001 || Kitt Peak || Spacewatch || — || align=right | 4.5 km || 
|-id=225 bgcolor=#fefefe
| 329225 ||  || — || March 15, 2001 || Kitt Peak || Spacewatch || ERI || align=right | 1.7 km || 
|-id=226 bgcolor=#E9E9E9
| 329226 ||  || — || August 29, 2005 || Kitt Peak || Spacewatch || — || align=right | 1.8 km || 
|-id=227 bgcolor=#E9E9E9
| 329227 ||  || — || October 14, 2001 || Socorro || LINEAR || — || align=right | 2.3 km || 
|-id=228 bgcolor=#fefefe
| 329228 ||  || — || February 2, 2005 || Kitt Peak || Spacewatch || — || align=right data-sort-value="0.82" | 820 m || 
|-id=229 bgcolor=#fefefe
| 329229 ||  || — || November 10, 1999 || Kitt Peak || Spacewatch || MAS || align=right data-sort-value="0.93" | 930 m || 
|-id=230 bgcolor=#d6d6d6
| 329230 ||  || — || February 10, 2002 || Socorro || LINEAR || K-2 || align=right | 2.2 km || 
|-id=231 bgcolor=#E9E9E9
| 329231 ||  || — || October 9, 2005 || Kitt Peak || Spacewatch || — || align=right | 1.3 km || 
|-id=232 bgcolor=#fefefe
| 329232 ||  || — || December 14, 2003 || Kitt Peak || Spacewatch || V || align=right data-sort-value="0.67" | 670 m || 
|-id=233 bgcolor=#d6d6d6
| 329233 ||  || — || March 16, 2001 || Kitt Peak || Spacewatch || EOS || align=right | 2.3 km || 
|-id=234 bgcolor=#E9E9E9
| 329234 ||  || — || December 21, 2006 || Kitt Peak || Spacewatch || — || align=right | 1.4 km || 
|-id=235 bgcolor=#d6d6d6
| 329235 ||  || — || September 27, 2003 || Kitt Peak || Spacewatch || HYG || align=right | 3.1 km || 
|-id=236 bgcolor=#E9E9E9
| 329236 ||  || — || January 9, 1999 || Kitt Peak || Spacewatch || — || align=right | 1.6 km || 
|-id=237 bgcolor=#E9E9E9
| 329237 ||  || — || April 28, 2000 || Socorro || LINEAR || MAR || align=right | 1.6 km || 
|-id=238 bgcolor=#d6d6d6
| 329238 ||  || — || January 30, 2006 || Kitt Peak || Spacewatch || THM || align=right | 2.6 km || 
|-id=239 bgcolor=#d6d6d6
| 329239 ||  || — || November 25, 2005 || Kitt Peak || Spacewatch || KOR || align=right | 1.4 km || 
|-id=240 bgcolor=#fefefe
| 329240 ||  || — || November 6, 1996 || Kitt Peak || Spacewatch || V || align=right | 1.0 km || 
|-id=241 bgcolor=#d6d6d6
| 329241 ||  || — || March 14, 2004 || Kitt Peak || Spacewatch || 3:2 || align=right | 5.7 km || 
|-id=242 bgcolor=#fefefe
| 329242 || 4564 T-2 || — || September 30, 1973 || Palomar || PLS || MAS || align=right data-sort-value="0.81" | 810 m || 
|-id=243 bgcolor=#E9E9E9
| 329243 ||  || — || October 16, 1977 || Palomar || PLS || DOR || align=right | 2.5 km || 
|-id=244 bgcolor=#FA8072
| 329244 ||  || — || October 18, 1992 || Kitt Peak || Spacewatch || — || align=right data-sort-value="0.56" | 560 m || 
|-id=245 bgcolor=#fefefe
| 329245 ||  || — || March 23, 1995 || Kitt Peak || Spacewatch || — || align=right data-sort-value="0.79" | 790 m || 
|-id=246 bgcolor=#E9E9E9
| 329246 ||  || — || March 27, 1995 || Kitt Peak || Spacewatch || — || align=right | 1.3 km || 
|-id=247 bgcolor=#fefefe
| 329247 ||  || — || July 30, 1995 || Kitt Peak || Spacewatch || — || align=right | 2.7 km || 
|-id=248 bgcolor=#fefefe
| 329248 ||  || — || August 22, 1995 || Kitt Peak || Spacewatch || — || align=right data-sort-value="0.81" | 810 m || 
|-id=249 bgcolor=#E9E9E9
| 329249 ||  || — || October 16, 1995 || Kitt Peak || Spacewatch || MAR || align=right | 1.5 km || 
|-id=250 bgcolor=#fefefe
| 329250 ||  || — || October 21, 1995 || Kitt Peak || Spacewatch || — || align=right data-sort-value="0.92" | 920 m || 
|-id=251 bgcolor=#E9E9E9
| 329251 ||  || — || October 19, 1995 || Kitt Peak || Spacewatch || — || align=right | 2.4 km || 
|-id=252 bgcolor=#fefefe
| 329252 ||  || — || November 15, 1995 || Kitt Peak || Spacewatch || NYS || align=right data-sort-value="0.61" | 610 m || 
|-id=253 bgcolor=#fefefe
| 329253 ||  || — || May 9, 1996 || Kitt Peak || Spacewatch || — || align=right | 1.2 km || 
|-id=254 bgcolor=#fefefe
| 329254 ||  || — || December 14, 1996 || Kitt Peak || Spacewatch || MAS || align=right data-sort-value="0.73" | 730 m || 
|-id=255 bgcolor=#d6d6d6
| 329255 ||  || — || October 3, 1997 || Caussols || ODAS || — || align=right | 3.4 km || 
|-id=256 bgcolor=#d6d6d6
| 329256 ||  || — || November 22, 1997 || Kitt Peak || Spacewatch || — || align=right | 4.2 km || 
|-id=257 bgcolor=#fefefe
| 329257 ||  || — || May 16, 1998 || Socorro || LINEAR || PHO || align=right | 2.0 km || 
|-id=258 bgcolor=#d6d6d6
| 329258 ||  || — || September 13, 1998 || Kitt Peak || Spacewatch || — || align=right | 2.5 km || 
|-id=259 bgcolor=#fefefe
| 329259 ||  || — || September 14, 1998 || Kitt Peak || Spacewatch || NYS || align=right data-sort-value="0.60" | 600 m || 
|-id=260 bgcolor=#fefefe
| 329260 ||  || — || September 25, 1998 || Kitt Peak || Spacewatch || NYS || align=right data-sort-value="0.68" | 680 m || 
|-id=261 bgcolor=#fefefe
| 329261 ||  || — || September 26, 1998 || Socorro || LINEAR || — || align=right data-sort-value="0.98" | 980 m || 
|-id=262 bgcolor=#fefefe
| 329262 ||  || — || October 19, 1998 || Catalina || CSS || PHO || align=right | 1.9 km || 
|-id=263 bgcolor=#fefefe
| 329263 ||  || — || November 11, 1998 || Socorro || LINEAR || — || align=right | 1.6 km || 
|-id=264 bgcolor=#E9E9E9
| 329264 ||  || — || February 11, 1999 || Socorro || LINEAR || — || align=right | 3.1 km || 
|-id=265 bgcolor=#fefefe
| 329265 ||  || — || August 17, 1999 || Kitt Peak || Spacewatch || — || align=right data-sort-value="0.68" | 680 m || 
|-id=266 bgcolor=#E9E9E9
| 329266 ||  || — || September 13, 1999 || Kitt Peak || Spacewatch || HEN || align=right | 1.0 km || 
|-id=267 bgcolor=#fefefe
| 329267 ||  || — || September 9, 1999 || Socorro || LINEAR || FLO || align=right data-sort-value="0.76" | 760 m || 
|-id=268 bgcolor=#fefefe
| 329268 ||  || — || September 8, 1999 || Catalina || CSS || — || align=right data-sort-value="0.82" | 820 m || 
|-id=269 bgcolor=#E9E9E9
| 329269 ||  || — || September 29, 1999 || Catalina || CSS || — || align=right | 3.7 km || 
|-id=270 bgcolor=#fefefe
| 329270 ||  || — || October 4, 1999 || Socorro || LINEAR || — || align=right data-sort-value="0.76" | 760 m || 
|-id=271 bgcolor=#E9E9E9
| 329271 ||  || — || October 4, 1999 || Socorro || LINEAR || — || align=right | 2.7 km || 
|-id=272 bgcolor=#fefefe
| 329272 ||  || — || October 10, 1999 || Socorro || LINEAR || V || align=right data-sort-value="0.68" | 680 m || 
|-id=273 bgcolor=#fefefe
| 329273 ||  || — || October 1, 1999 || Catalina || CSS || — || align=right data-sort-value="0.71" | 710 m || 
|-id=274 bgcolor=#E9E9E9
| 329274 ||  || — || October 9, 1999 || Socorro || LINEAR || — || align=right | 2.4 km || 
|-id=275 bgcolor=#FFC2E0
| 329275 ||  || — || November 5, 1999 || Socorro || LINEAR || APO || align=right data-sort-value="0.37" | 370 m || 
|-id=276 bgcolor=#E9E9E9
| 329276 ||  || — || November 15, 1999 || Bergisch Gladbac || W. Bickel || — || align=right | 2.7 km || 
|-id=277 bgcolor=#fefefe
| 329277 ||  || — || November 3, 1999 || Socorro || LINEAR || PHO || align=right | 2.4 km || 
|-id=278 bgcolor=#fefefe
| 329278 ||  || — || November 9, 1999 || Socorro || LINEAR || — || align=right data-sort-value="0.99" | 990 m || 
|-id=279 bgcolor=#d6d6d6
| 329279 ||  || — || November 6, 1999 || Kitt Peak || Spacewatch || — || align=right | 3.4 km || 
|-id=280 bgcolor=#d6d6d6
| 329280 ||  || — || November 10, 1999 || Kitt Peak || Spacewatch || — || align=right | 2.8 km || 
|-id=281 bgcolor=#d6d6d6
| 329281 ||  || — || November 14, 1999 || Socorro || LINEAR || — || align=right | 5.6 km || 
|-id=282 bgcolor=#FA8072
| 329282 ||  || — || November 30, 1999 || Socorro || LINEAR || — || align=right | 1.6 km || 
|-id=283 bgcolor=#fefefe
| 329283 ||  || — || December 7, 1999 || Socorro || LINEAR || — || align=right | 1.0 km || 
|-id=284 bgcolor=#fefefe
| 329284 ||  || — || February 5, 2000 || Kitt Peak || M. W. Buie || MAS || align=right data-sort-value="0.73" | 730 m || 
|-id=285 bgcolor=#fefefe
| 329285 ||  || — || February 5, 2000 || Kitt Peak || M. W. Buie || EUT || align=right data-sort-value="0.73" | 730 m || 
|-id=286 bgcolor=#d6d6d6
| 329286 ||  || — || February 25, 2000 || Kitt Peak || Spacewatch || — || align=right | 3.4 km || 
|-id=287 bgcolor=#d6d6d6
| 329287 ||  || — || February 25, 2000 || Kitt Peak || Spacewatch || — || align=right | 3.4 km || 
|-id=288 bgcolor=#fefefe
| 329288 ||  || — || March 3, 2000 || Socorro || LINEAR || V || align=right | 1.0 km || 
|-id=289 bgcolor=#d6d6d6
| 329289 ||  || — || March 27, 2000 || Kitt Peak || Spacewatch || — || align=right | 3.6 km || 
|-id=290 bgcolor=#d6d6d6
| 329290 ||  || — || April 26, 2000 || Kitt Peak || Spacewatch || — || align=right | 4.0 km || 
|-id=291 bgcolor=#FFC2E0
| 329291 ||  || — || May 2, 2000 || Socorro || LINEAR || AMO || align=right data-sort-value="0.53" | 530 m || 
|-id=292 bgcolor=#E9E9E9
| 329292 ||  || — || June 8, 2000 || Socorro || LINEAR || — || align=right | 3.0 km || 
|-id=293 bgcolor=#E9E9E9
| 329293 ||  || — || July 5, 2000 || Anderson Mesa || LONEOS || — || align=right | 1.5 km || 
|-id=294 bgcolor=#E9E9E9
| 329294 ||  || — || August 24, 2000 || Socorro || LINEAR || — || align=right | 1.5 km || 
|-id=295 bgcolor=#E9E9E9
| 329295 ||  || — || August 26, 2000 || Socorro || LINEAR || — || align=right | 1.7 km || 
|-id=296 bgcolor=#E9E9E9
| 329296 ||  || — || August 29, 2000 || Socorro || LINEAR || — || align=right | 2.0 km || 
|-id=297 bgcolor=#E9E9E9
| 329297 ||  || — || August 31, 2000 || Socorro || LINEAR || — || align=right | 1.5 km || 
|-id=298 bgcolor=#E9E9E9
| 329298 ||  || — || September 1, 2000 || Socorro || LINEAR || JUN || align=right data-sort-value="0.99" | 990 m || 
|-id=299 bgcolor=#E9E9E9
| 329299 ||  || — || September 3, 2000 || Socorro || LINEAR || — || align=right | 3.5 km || 
|-id=300 bgcolor=#E9E9E9
| 329300 ||  || — || September 7, 2000 || Kitt Peak || Spacewatch || — || align=right | 2.6 km || 
|}

329301–329400 

|-bgcolor=#FA8072
| 329301 ||  || — || September 7, 2000 || Socorro || LINEAR || — || align=right | 3.2 km || 
|-id=302 bgcolor=#E9E9E9
| 329302 ||  || — || September 1, 2000 || Socorro || LINEAR || ADE || align=right | 3.6 km || 
|-id=303 bgcolor=#E9E9E9
| 329303 ||  || — || September 3, 2000 || Socorro || LINEAR || — || align=right | 2.8 km || 
|-id=304 bgcolor=#E9E9E9
| 329304 ||  || — || September 5, 2000 || Anderson Mesa || LONEOS || — || align=right | 1.8 km || 
|-id=305 bgcolor=#E9E9E9
| 329305 ||  || — || September 23, 2000 || Socorro || LINEAR || EUN || align=right | 1.6 km || 
|-id=306 bgcolor=#E9E9E9
| 329306 ||  || — || September 23, 2000 || Socorro || LINEAR || — || align=right | 2.4 km || 
|-id=307 bgcolor=#E9E9E9
| 329307 ||  || — || September 24, 2000 || Socorro || LINEAR || MIS || align=right | 2.6 km || 
|-id=308 bgcolor=#E9E9E9
| 329308 ||  || — || September 24, 2000 || Socorro || LINEAR || — || align=right | 1.4 km || 
|-id=309 bgcolor=#E9E9E9
| 329309 ||  || — || September 24, 2000 || Socorro || LINEAR || — || align=right | 1.2 km || 
|-id=310 bgcolor=#E9E9E9
| 329310 ||  || — || September 24, 2000 || Socorro || LINEAR || EUN || align=right | 2.0 km || 
|-id=311 bgcolor=#E9E9E9
| 329311 ||  || — || September 22, 2000 || Socorro || LINEAR || GER || align=right | 2.4 km || 
|-id=312 bgcolor=#E9E9E9
| 329312 ||  || — || September 22, 2000 || Socorro || LINEAR || — || align=right | 4.3 km || 
|-id=313 bgcolor=#fefefe
| 329313 ||  || — || September 20, 2000 || Haleakala || NEAT || — || align=right data-sort-value="0.88" | 880 m || 
|-id=314 bgcolor=#E9E9E9
| 329314 ||  || — || September 24, 2000 || Socorro || LINEAR || — || align=right | 1.0 km || 
|-id=315 bgcolor=#E9E9E9
| 329315 ||  || — || September 27, 2000 || Socorro || LINEAR || — || align=right | 1.9 km || 
|-id=316 bgcolor=#E9E9E9
| 329316 ||  || — || September 24, 2000 || Socorro || LINEAR || — || align=right | 1.9 km || 
|-id=317 bgcolor=#E9E9E9
| 329317 ||  || — || September 24, 2000 || Socorro || LINEAR || — || align=right | 2.8 km || 
|-id=318 bgcolor=#E9E9E9
| 329318 ||  || — || September 27, 2000 || Socorro || LINEAR || — || align=right | 2.9 km || 
|-id=319 bgcolor=#E9E9E9
| 329319 ||  || — || September 28, 2000 || Socorro || LINEAR || MAR || align=right | 1.7 km || 
|-id=320 bgcolor=#E9E9E9
| 329320 ||  || — || September 29, 2000 || Anderson Mesa || LONEOS || — || align=right | 3.4 km || 
|-id=321 bgcolor=#E9E9E9
| 329321 ||  || — || October 4, 2000 || Kitt Peak || Spacewatch || — || align=right | 1.0 km || 
|-id=322 bgcolor=#E9E9E9
| 329322 ||  || — || October 1, 2000 || Socorro || LINEAR || — || align=right | 2.2 km || 
|-id=323 bgcolor=#E9E9E9
| 329323 ||  || — || October 25, 2000 || Socorro || LINEAR || — || align=right | 2.3 km || 
|-id=324 bgcolor=#E9E9E9
| 329324 ||  || — || October 25, 2000 || Socorro || LINEAR || — || align=right | 2.6 km || 
|-id=325 bgcolor=#E9E9E9
| 329325 ||  || — || October 30, 2000 || Socorro || LINEAR || EUN || align=right | 1.8 km || 
|-id=326 bgcolor=#fefefe
| 329326 ||  || — || November 1, 2000 || Socorro || LINEAR || — || align=right data-sort-value="0.83" | 830 m || 
|-id=327 bgcolor=#E9E9E9
| 329327 ||  || — || November 3, 2000 || Socorro || LINEAR || — || align=right | 3.9 km || 
|-id=328 bgcolor=#E9E9E9
| 329328 ||  || — || November 20, 2000 || Socorro || LINEAR || — || align=right | 2.1 km || 
|-id=329 bgcolor=#E9E9E9
| 329329 ||  || — || November 20, 2000 || Socorro || LINEAR || — || align=right | 2.3 km || 
|-id=330 bgcolor=#FA8072
| 329330 ||  || — || November 27, 2000 || Socorro || LINEAR || H || align=right data-sort-value="0.94" | 940 m || 
|-id=331 bgcolor=#fefefe
| 329331 ||  || — || November 27, 2000 || Socorro || LINEAR || H || align=right data-sort-value="0.71" | 710 m || 
|-id=332 bgcolor=#d6d6d6
| 329332 ||  || — || December 29, 2000 || Haleakala || NEAT || TRP || align=right | 3.3 km || 
|-id=333 bgcolor=#d6d6d6
| 329333 ||  || — || February 15, 2001 || Socorro || LINEAR || — || align=right | 4.9 km || 
|-id=334 bgcolor=#fefefe
| 329334 ||  || — || March 16, 2001 || Socorro || LINEAR || — || align=right data-sort-value="0.97" | 970 m || 
|-id=335 bgcolor=#d6d6d6
| 329335 ||  || — || March 21, 2001 || Anderson Mesa || LONEOS || — || align=right | 3.9 km || 
|-id=336 bgcolor=#fefefe
| 329336 ||  || — || March 21, 2001 || Kitt Peak || SKADS || MAS || align=right data-sort-value="0.69" | 690 m || 
|-id=337 bgcolor=#fefefe
| 329337 ||  || — || April 27, 2001 || Kitt Peak || Spacewatch || EUT || align=right data-sort-value="0.69" | 690 m || 
|-id=338 bgcolor=#FFC2E0
| 329338 ||  || — || May 15, 2001 || Palomar || NEAT || APO || align=right data-sort-value="0.55" | 550 m || 
|-id=339 bgcolor=#d6d6d6
| 329339 ||  || — || May 15, 2001 || Palomar || NEAT || — || align=right | 4.4 km || 
|-id=340 bgcolor=#FFC2E0
| 329340 ||  || — || June 13, 2001 || Socorro || LINEAR || AMO || align=right data-sort-value="0.49" | 490 m || 
|-id=341 bgcolor=#fefefe
| 329341 ||  || — || July 21, 2001 || Palomar || NEAT || — || align=right | 1.5 km || 
|-id=342 bgcolor=#FA8072
| 329342 ||  || — || July 27, 2001 || Anderson Mesa || LONEOS || — || align=right data-sort-value="0.82" | 820 m || 
|-id=343 bgcolor=#FFC2E0
| 329343 ||  || — || August 22, 2001 || Socorro || LINEAR || AMO || align=right data-sort-value="0.38" | 380 m || 
|-id=344 bgcolor=#d6d6d6
| 329344 ||  || — || August 27, 2001 || Eskridge || G. Hug || — || align=right | 3.9 km || 
|-id=345 bgcolor=#E9E9E9
| 329345 ||  || — || August 20, 2001 || Socorro || LINEAR || — || align=right | 1.6 km || 
|-id=346 bgcolor=#d6d6d6
| 329346 ||  || — || August 16, 2001 || Palomar || NEAT || fast? || align=right | 3.0 km || 
|-id=347 bgcolor=#E9E9E9
| 329347 ||  || — || September 7, 2001 || Socorro || LINEAR || CLO || align=right | 3.0 km || 
|-id=348 bgcolor=#E9E9E9
| 329348 ||  || — || September 7, 2001 || Socorro || LINEAR || — || align=right | 1.4 km || 
|-id=349 bgcolor=#d6d6d6
| 329349 ||  || — || September 12, 2001 || Socorro || LINEAR || 7:4 || align=right | 3.4 km || 
|-id=350 bgcolor=#E9E9E9
| 329350 ||  || — || September 18, 2001 || Kitt Peak || Spacewatch || — || align=right | 1.1 km || 
|-id=351 bgcolor=#fefefe
| 329351 ||  || — || September 16, 2001 || Socorro || LINEAR || V || align=right | 1.1 km || 
|-id=352 bgcolor=#E9E9E9
| 329352 ||  || — || September 17, 2001 || Socorro || LINEAR || — || align=right data-sort-value="0.95" | 950 m || 
|-id=353 bgcolor=#E9E9E9
| 329353 ||  || — || September 16, 2001 || Socorro || LINEAR || — || align=right | 1.5 km || 
|-id=354 bgcolor=#d6d6d6
| 329354 ||  || — || September 19, 2001 || Socorro || LINEAR || HYG || align=right | 3.8 km || 
|-id=355 bgcolor=#E9E9E9
| 329355 ||  || — || September 19, 2001 || Socorro || LINEAR || — || align=right | 1.6 km || 
|-id=356 bgcolor=#fefefe
| 329356 ||  || — || September 20, 2001 || Socorro || LINEAR || — || align=right data-sort-value="0.86" | 860 m || 
|-id=357 bgcolor=#E9E9E9
| 329357 ||  || — || September 20, 2001 || Socorro || LINEAR || GER || align=right | 2.5 km || 
|-id=358 bgcolor=#E9E9E9
| 329358 ||  || — || September 20, 2001 || Socorro || LINEAR || — || align=right data-sort-value="0.96" | 960 m || 
|-id=359 bgcolor=#d6d6d6
| 329359 ||  || — || October 15, 2001 || Socorro || LINEAR || — || align=right | 3.2 km || 
|-id=360 bgcolor=#d6d6d6
| 329360 ||  || — || October 14, 2001 || Socorro || LINEAR || THB || align=right | 3.8 km || 
|-id=361 bgcolor=#E9E9E9
| 329361 ||  || — || October 15, 2001 || Socorro || LINEAR || MAR || align=right | 1.7 km || 
|-id=362 bgcolor=#E9E9E9
| 329362 ||  || — || October 14, 2001 || Kitt Peak || Spacewatch || — || align=right | 1.1 km || 
|-id=363 bgcolor=#d6d6d6
| 329363 ||  || — || October 14, 2001 || Socorro || LINEAR || 7:4 || align=right | 5.1 km || 
|-id=364 bgcolor=#E9E9E9
| 329364 ||  || — || October 7, 2001 || Palomar || NEAT || — || align=right | 1.7 km || 
|-id=365 bgcolor=#E9E9E9
| 329365 ||  || — || October 20, 2001 || Socorro || LINEAR || — || align=right | 1.0 km || 
|-id=366 bgcolor=#E9E9E9
| 329366 ||  || — || October 22, 2001 || Socorro || LINEAR || — || align=right | 1.5 km || 
|-id=367 bgcolor=#E9E9E9
| 329367 ||  || — || October 23, 2001 || Socorro || LINEAR || — || align=right | 1.4 km || 
|-id=368 bgcolor=#E9E9E9
| 329368 ||  || — || October 23, 2001 || Socorro || LINEAR || HNS || align=right | 1.6 km || 
|-id=369 bgcolor=#E9E9E9
| 329369 ||  || — || October 24, 2001 || Kitt Peak || Spacewatch || — || align=right | 1.1 km || 
|-id=370 bgcolor=#d6d6d6
| 329370 ||  || — || October 18, 2001 || Palomar || NEAT || 7:4 || align=right | 4.3 km || 
|-id=371 bgcolor=#E9E9E9
| 329371 ||  || — || October 16, 2001 || Palomar || NEAT || — || align=right | 1.1 km || 
|-id=372 bgcolor=#E9E9E9
| 329372 ||  || — || November 11, 2001 || Socorro || LINEAR || — || align=right | 1.5 km || 
|-id=373 bgcolor=#E9E9E9
| 329373 ||  || — || November 9, 2001 || Palomar || NEAT || — || align=right | 2.1 km || 
|-id=374 bgcolor=#FA8072
| 329374 ||  || — || November 21, 2001 || Socorro || LINEAR || — || align=right | 1.5 km || 
|-id=375 bgcolor=#E9E9E9
| 329375 ||  || — || November 17, 2001 || Socorro || LINEAR || — || align=right | 1.5 km || 
|-id=376 bgcolor=#E9E9E9
| 329376 ||  || — || November 19, 2001 || Anderson Mesa || LONEOS || — || align=right | 1.5 km || 
|-id=377 bgcolor=#E9E9E9
| 329377 ||  || — || November 20, 2001 || Socorro || LINEAR || — || align=right | 1.0 km || 
|-id=378 bgcolor=#E9E9E9
| 329378 ||  || — || November 20, 2001 || Socorro || LINEAR || AER || align=right | 1.5 km || 
|-id=379 bgcolor=#E9E9E9
| 329379 ||  || — || October 26, 2001 || Kitt Peak || Spacewatch || — || align=right | 1.6 km || 
|-id=380 bgcolor=#E9E9E9
| 329380 ||  || — || November 19, 2001 || Socorro || LINEAR || — || align=right | 1.8 km || 
|-id=381 bgcolor=#E9E9E9
| 329381 ||  || — || November 21, 2001 || Socorro || LINEAR || EUN || align=right | 1.7 km || 
|-id=382 bgcolor=#E9E9E9
| 329382 ||  || — || December 9, 2001 || Socorro || LINEAR || — || align=right | 2.2 km || 
|-id=383 bgcolor=#E9E9E9
| 329383 ||  || — || December 11, 2001 || Socorro || LINEAR || EUN || align=right | 1.1 km || 
|-id=384 bgcolor=#E9E9E9
| 329384 ||  || — || December 11, 2001 || Socorro || LINEAR || — || align=right | 2.3 km || 
|-id=385 bgcolor=#E9E9E9
| 329385 ||  || — || December 13, 2001 || Socorro || LINEAR || — || align=right | 2.4 km || 
|-id=386 bgcolor=#E9E9E9
| 329386 ||  || — || December 14, 2001 || Socorro || LINEAR || — || align=right | 1.7 km || 
|-id=387 bgcolor=#E9E9E9
| 329387 ||  || — || December 14, 2001 || Socorro || LINEAR || JUN || align=right | 1.3 km || 
|-id=388 bgcolor=#E9E9E9
| 329388 ||  || — || December 14, 2001 || Socorro || LINEAR || — || align=right | 1.7 km || 
|-id=389 bgcolor=#E9E9E9
| 329389 ||  || — || December 9, 2001 || Kitt Peak || Spacewatch || — || align=right | 3.2 km || 
|-id=390 bgcolor=#FFC2E0
| 329390 ||  || — || December 18, 2001 || Palomar || NEAT || AMO || align=right data-sort-value="0.53" | 530 m || 
|-id=391 bgcolor=#fefefe
| 329391 ||  || — || December 22, 2001 || Socorro || LINEAR || — || align=right | 1.5 km || 
|-id=392 bgcolor=#E9E9E9
| 329392 ||  || — || December 17, 2001 || Socorro || LINEAR || — || align=right | 1.9 km || 
|-id=393 bgcolor=#E9E9E9
| 329393 ||  || — || December 17, 2001 || Socorro || LINEAR || — || align=right | 1.2 km || 
|-id=394 bgcolor=#E9E9E9
| 329394 ||  || — || December 18, 2001 || Socorro || LINEAR || ADE || align=right | 2.0 km || 
|-id=395 bgcolor=#FFC2E0
| 329395 ||  || — || January 3, 2002 || Socorro || LINEAR || APO +1km || align=right data-sort-value="0.94" | 940 m || 
|-id=396 bgcolor=#E9E9E9
| 329396 ||  || — || January 9, 2002 || Socorro || LINEAR || — || align=right | 1.5 km || 
|-id=397 bgcolor=#fefefe
| 329397 ||  || — || January 9, 2002 || Socorro || LINEAR || — || align=right data-sort-value="0.75" | 750 m || 
|-id=398 bgcolor=#E9E9E9
| 329398 ||  || — || January 14, 2002 || Socorro || LINEAR || — || align=right | 1.2 km || 
|-id=399 bgcolor=#E9E9E9
| 329399 ||  || — || January 13, 2002 || Socorro || LINEAR || DOR || align=right | 3.6 km || 
|-id=400 bgcolor=#E9E9E9
| 329400 ||  || — || January 14, 2002 || Socorro || LINEAR || — || align=right | 2.3 km || 
|}

329401–329500 

|-bgcolor=#E9E9E9
| 329401 ||  || — || January 22, 2002 || Socorro || LINEAR || — || align=right | 3.3 km || 
|-id=402 bgcolor=#E9E9E9
| 329402 ||  || — || January 8, 2002 || Socorro || LINEAR || — || align=right | 2.7 km || 
|-id=403 bgcolor=#E9E9E9
| 329403 ||  || — || February 6, 2002 || Socorro || LINEAR || — || align=right | 1.5 km || 
|-id=404 bgcolor=#E9E9E9
| 329404 ||  || — || February 5, 2002 || Palomar || NEAT || — || align=right | 2.8 km || 
|-id=405 bgcolor=#fefefe
| 329405 ||  || — || February 10, 2002 || Socorro || LINEAR || — || align=right data-sort-value="0.73" | 730 m || 
|-id=406 bgcolor=#E9E9E9
| 329406 ||  || — || February 11, 2002 || Anderson Mesa || LONEOS || — || align=right | 2.5 km || 
|-id=407 bgcolor=#E9E9E9
| 329407 ||  || — || March 5, 2002 || Kitt Peak || Spacewatch || HOF || align=right | 2.4 km || 
|-id=408 bgcolor=#fefefe
| 329408 ||  || — || March 12, 2002 || Socorro || LINEAR || FLO || align=right data-sort-value="0.77" | 770 m || 
|-id=409 bgcolor=#E9E9E9
| 329409 ||  || — || March 14, 2002 || Socorro || LINEAR || WAT || align=right | 2.1 km || 
|-id=410 bgcolor=#fefefe
| 329410 ||  || — || March 10, 2002 || Cima Ekar || ADAS || — || align=right data-sort-value="0.88" | 880 m || 
|-id=411 bgcolor=#fefefe
| 329411 ||  || — || April 9, 2002 || Kitt Peak || Spacewatch || — || align=right data-sort-value="0.70" | 700 m || 
|-id=412 bgcolor=#fefefe
| 329412 ||  || — || May 9, 2002 || Socorro || LINEAR || FLO || align=right data-sort-value="0.95" | 950 m || 
|-id=413 bgcolor=#fefefe
| 329413 ||  || — || May 11, 2002 || Socorro || LINEAR || FLO || align=right data-sort-value="0.91" | 910 m || 
|-id=414 bgcolor=#d6d6d6
| 329414 ||  || — || May 30, 2002 || Palomar || NEAT || NAE || align=right | 5.0 km || 
|-id=415 bgcolor=#d6d6d6
| 329415 ||  || — || June 5, 2002 || Socorro || LINEAR || — || align=right | 3.5 km || 
|-id=416 bgcolor=#d6d6d6
| 329416 ||  || — || October 9, 2008 || Catalina || CSS || — || align=right | 3.5 km || 
|-id=417 bgcolor=#fefefe
| 329417 ||  || — || November 23, 2006 || Kitt Peak || Spacewatch || FLO || align=right data-sort-value="0.61" | 610 m || 
|-id=418 bgcolor=#d6d6d6
| 329418 ||  || — || July 10, 2002 || Campo Imperatore || CINEOS || HYG || align=right | 3.1 km || 
|-id=419 bgcolor=#fefefe
| 329419 ||  || — || July 1, 2002 || Palomar || NEAT || — || align=right data-sort-value="0.94" | 940 m || 
|-id=420 bgcolor=#fefefe
| 329420 ||  || — || July 9, 2002 || Socorro || LINEAR || — || align=right | 1.0 km || 
|-id=421 bgcolor=#d6d6d6
| 329421 ||  || — || July 13, 2002 || Palomar || NEAT || — || align=right | 4.1 km || 
|-id=422 bgcolor=#d6d6d6
| 329422 ||  || — || July 5, 2002 || Socorro || LINEAR || — || align=right | 3.1 km || 
|-id=423 bgcolor=#d6d6d6
| 329423 ||  || — || July 4, 2002 || Palomar || NEAT || — || align=right | 3.6 km || 
|-id=424 bgcolor=#d6d6d6
| 329424 ||  || — || July 2, 2002 || Palomar || NEAT || HYG || align=right | 3.1 km || 
|-id=425 bgcolor=#d6d6d6
| 329425 ||  || — || July 14, 2002 || Palomar || NEAT || — || align=right | 2.6 km || 
|-id=426 bgcolor=#d6d6d6
| 329426 ||  || — || July 8, 2002 || Palomar || NEAT || — || align=right | 3.7 km || 
|-id=427 bgcolor=#fefefe
| 329427 ||  || — || July 8, 2002 || Palomar || NEAT || V || align=right data-sort-value="0.68" | 680 m || 
|-id=428 bgcolor=#d6d6d6
| 329428 ||  || — || October 22, 2003 || Kitt Peak || Spacewatch || EOS || align=right | 2.0 km || 
|-id=429 bgcolor=#d6d6d6
| 329429 ||  || — || March 9, 2010 || WISE || WISE || — || align=right | 3.1 km || 
|-id=430 bgcolor=#d6d6d6
| 329430 ||  || — || September 4, 2008 || Kitt Peak || Spacewatch || — || align=right | 2.6 km || 
|-id=431 bgcolor=#E9E9E9
| 329431 ||  || — || January 16, 2004 || Kitt Peak || Spacewatch || — || align=right data-sort-value="0.98" | 980 m || 
|-id=432 bgcolor=#fefefe
| 329432 ||  || — || July 27, 2009 || Catalina || CSS || V || align=right data-sort-value="0.57" | 570 m || 
|-id=433 bgcolor=#d6d6d6
| 329433 ||  || — || March 4, 2006 || Mount Lemmon || Mount Lemmon Survey || — || align=right | 2.8 km || 
|-id=434 bgcolor=#fefefe
| 329434 ||  || — || July 17, 2002 || Socorro || LINEAR || — || align=right | 1.1 km || 
|-id=435 bgcolor=#FA8072
| 329435 ||  || — || July 17, 2002 || Palomar || NEAT || H || align=right | 1.0 km || 
|-id=436 bgcolor=#FA8072
| 329436 ||  || — || July 22, 2002 || Palomar || NEAT || — || align=right data-sort-value="0.68" | 680 m || 
|-id=437 bgcolor=#FFC2E0
| 329437 ||  || — || July 30, 2002 || Palomar || NEAT || ATEPHA || align=right data-sort-value="0.48" | 480 m || 
|-id=438 bgcolor=#fefefe
| 329438 ||  || — || August 1, 2002 || Campo Imperatore || CINEOS || — || align=right data-sort-value="0.75" | 750 m || 
|-id=439 bgcolor=#d6d6d6
| 329439 ||  || — || August 5, 2002 || Palomar || NEAT || — || align=right | 4.4 km || 
|-id=440 bgcolor=#d6d6d6
| 329440 ||  || — || August 6, 2002 || Palomar || NEAT || — || align=right | 2.8 km || 
|-id=441 bgcolor=#d6d6d6
| 329441 ||  || — || August 6, 2002 || Palomar || NEAT || — || align=right | 4.0 km || 
|-id=442 bgcolor=#fefefe
| 329442 ||  || — || August 6, 2002 || Palomar || NEAT || NYS || align=right data-sort-value="0.76" | 760 m || 
|-id=443 bgcolor=#fefefe
| 329443 ||  || — || August 6, 2002 || Palomar || NEAT || NYS || align=right data-sort-value="0.90" | 900 m || 
|-id=444 bgcolor=#fefefe
| 329444 ||  || — || August 6, 2002 || Palomar || NEAT || FLO || align=right data-sort-value="0.67" | 670 m || 
|-id=445 bgcolor=#d6d6d6
| 329445 ||  || — || August 12, 2002 || Socorro || LINEAR || — || align=right | 2.9 km || 
|-id=446 bgcolor=#d6d6d6
| 329446 ||  || — || August 12, 2002 || Socorro || LINEAR || — || align=right | 4.2 km || 
|-id=447 bgcolor=#fefefe
| 329447 ||  || — || August 12, 2002 || Socorro || LINEAR || — || align=right data-sort-value="0.89" | 890 m || 
|-id=448 bgcolor=#d6d6d6
| 329448 ||  || — || August 12, 2002 || Socorro || LINEAR || EMA || align=right | 4.8 km || 
|-id=449 bgcolor=#d6d6d6
| 329449 ||  || — || August 15, 2002 || Kitt Peak || Spacewatch || — || align=right | 4.0 km || 
|-id=450 bgcolor=#d6d6d6
| 329450 ||  || — || August 13, 2002 || Socorro || LINEAR || — || align=right | 6.2 km || 
|-id=451 bgcolor=#fefefe
| 329451 ||  || — || August 8, 2002 || Palomar || NEAT || FLO || align=right data-sort-value="0.70" | 700 m || 
|-id=452 bgcolor=#d6d6d6
| 329452 ||  || — || August 15, 2002 || Palomar || NEAT || — || align=right | 3.8 km || 
|-id=453 bgcolor=#d6d6d6
| 329453 ||  || — || August 8, 2002 || Palomar || NEAT || THM || align=right | 2.4 km || 
|-id=454 bgcolor=#d6d6d6
| 329454 ||  || — || August 11, 2002 || Palomar || NEAT || — || align=right | 3.0 km || 
|-id=455 bgcolor=#d6d6d6
| 329455 ||  || — || August 11, 2002 || Palomar || NEAT || EOS || align=right | 2.2 km || 
|-id=456 bgcolor=#d6d6d6
| 329456 ||  || — || August 8, 2002 || Palomar || NEAT || — || align=right | 3.2 km || 
|-id=457 bgcolor=#fefefe
| 329457 ||  || — || August 15, 2002 || Palomar || NEAT || — || align=right data-sort-value="0.90" | 900 m || 
|-id=458 bgcolor=#d6d6d6
| 329458 ||  || — || August 6, 2002 || Palomar || NEAT || — || align=right | 3.0 km || 
|-id=459 bgcolor=#fefefe
| 329459 ||  || — || February 13, 2004 || Kitt Peak || Spacewatch || V || align=right data-sort-value="0.76" | 760 m || 
|-id=460 bgcolor=#d6d6d6
| 329460 ||  || — || December 3, 2004 || Kitt Peak || Spacewatch || — || align=right | 4.2 km || 
|-id=461 bgcolor=#fefefe
| 329461 ||  || — || May 26, 2009 || Kitt Peak || Spacewatch || — || align=right data-sort-value="0.64" | 640 m || 
|-id=462 bgcolor=#d6d6d6
| 329462 ||  || — || August 16, 2002 || Haleakala || NEAT || — || align=right | 3.3 km || 
|-id=463 bgcolor=#d6d6d6
| 329463 ||  || — || August 19, 2002 || Kvistaberg || UDAS || — || align=right | 5.0 km || 
|-id=464 bgcolor=#d6d6d6
| 329464 ||  || — || August 26, 2002 || Palomar || NEAT || VER || align=right | 5.1 km || 
|-id=465 bgcolor=#fefefe
| 329465 ||  || — || August 26, 2002 || Palomar || NEAT || NYS || align=right data-sort-value="0.61" | 610 m || 
|-id=466 bgcolor=#d6d6d6
| 329466 ||  || — || August 28, 2002 || Socorro || LINEAR || EUP || align=right | 7.4 km || 
|-id=467 bgcolor=#d6d6d6
| 329467 ||  || — || August 29, 2002 || Palomar || NEAT || — || align=right | 3.8 km || 
|-id=468 bgcolor=#d6d6d6
| 329468 ||  || — || August 29, 2002 || Palomar || NEAT || HYG || align=right | 3.7 km || 
|-id=469 bgcolor=#d6d6d6
| 329469 ||  || — || August 29, 2002 || Palomar || NEAT || — || align=right | 3.4 km || 
|-id=470 bgcolor=#fefefe
| 329470 ||  || — || August 30, 2002 || Kitt Peak || Spacewatch || — || align=right | 1.0 km || 
|-id=471 bgcolor=#fefefe
| 329471 ||  || — || August 18, 2002 || Palomar || S. F. Hönig || — || align=right data-sort-value="0.71" | 710 m || 
|-id=472 bgcolor=#d6d6d6
| 329472 ||  || — || August 28, 2002 || Palomar || R. Matson || — || align=right | 3.5 km || 
|-id=473 bgcolor=#fefefe
| 329473 ||  || — || August 17, 2002 || Palomar || NEAT || — || align=right data-sort-value="0.86" | 860 m || 
|-id=474 bgcolor=#fefefe
| 329474 ||  || — || August 29, 2002 || Palomar || NEAT || V || align=right data-sort-value="0.52" | 520 m || 
|-id=475 bgcolor=#d6d6d6
| 329475 ||  || — || August 18, 2002 || Palomar || NEAT || — || align=right | 2.8 km || 
|-id=476 bgcolor=#d6d6d6
| 329476 ||  || — || August 16, 2002 || Palomar || NEAT || — || align=right | 3.7 km || 
|-id=477 bgcolor=#d6d6d6
| 329477 ||  || — || August 30, 2002 || Palomar || NEAT || HYG || align=right | 2.8 km || 
|-id=478 bgcolor=#d6d6d6
| 329478 ||  || — || August 18, 2002 || Palomar || NEAT || — || align=right | 3.0 km || 
|-id=479 bgcolor=#d6d6d6
| 329479 ||  || — || August 30, 2002 || Palomar || NEAT || HYG || align=right | 4.3 km || 
|-id=480 bgcolor=#fefefe
| 329480 ||  || — || August 26, 2002 || Palomar || NEAT || V || align=right data-sort-value="0.56" | 560 m || 
|-id=481 bgcolor=#d6d6d6
| 329481 ||  || — || December 11, 2004 || Kitt Peak || Spacewatch || — || align=right | 3.6 km || 
|-id=482 bgcolor=#d6d6d6
| 329482 ||  || — || August 18, 2002 || Palomar || NEAT || THM || align=right | 2.6 km || 
|-id=483 bgcolor=#d6d6d6
| 329483 ||  || — || July 29, 2002 || Palomar || NEAT || — || align=right | 3.4 km || 
|-id=484 bgcolor=#d6d6d6
| 329484 ||  || — || August 17, 2002 || Palomar || NEAT || — || align=right | 2.8 km || 
|-id=485 bgcolor=#fefefe
| 329485 ||  || — || August 28, 2002 || Palomar || NEAT || — || align=right data-sort-value="0.82" | 820 m || 
|-id=486 bgcolor=#d6d6d6
| 329486 ||  || — || August 27, 2002 || Palomar || NEAT || — || align=right | 3.4 km || 
|-id=487 bgcolor=#d6d6d6
| 329487 ||  || — || August 16, 2002 || Palomar || NEAT || HYG || align=right | 3.1 km || 
|-id=488 bgcolor=#d6d6d6
| 329488 ||  || — || August 30, 2002 || Palomar || NEAT || HYG || align=right | 3.0 km || 
|-id=489 bgcolor=#fefefe
| 329489 ||  || — || August 18, 2002 || Palomar || NEAT || — || align=right data-sort-value="0.84" | 840 m || 
|-id=490 bgcolor=#d6d6d6
| 329490 ||  || — || August 26, 2002 || Palomar || NEAT || — || align=right | 4.9 km || 
|-id=491 bgcolor=#d6d6d6
| 329491 ||  || — || August 16, 2002 || Palomar || NEAT || — || align=right | 3.2 km || 
|-id=492 bgcolor=#d6d6d6
| 329492 ||  || — || October 16, 2003 || Kitt Peak || Spacewatch || — || align=right | 4.8 km || 
|-id=493 bgcolor=#d6d6d6
| 329493 ||  || — || September 29, 2008 || Catalina || CSS || LIX || align=right | 4.0 km || 
|-id=494 bgcolor=#d6d6d6
| 329494 ||  || — || September 4, 2002 || Palomar || NEAT || THM || align=right | 2.9 km || 
|-id=495 bgcolor=#d6d6d6
| 329495 ||  || — || September 5, 2002 || Socorro || LINEAR || — || align=right | 4.9 km || 
|-id=496 bgcolor=#fefefe
| 329496 ||  || — || September 5, 2002 || Socorro || LINEAR || — || align=right data-sort-value="0.86" | 860 m || 
|-id=497 bgcolor=#d6d6d6
| 329497 ||  || — || September 5, 2002 || Socorro || LINEAR || — || align=right | 3.4 km || 
|-id=498 bgcolor=#d6d6d6
| 329498 ||  || — || September 8, 2002 || Haleakala || NEAT || — || align=right | 4.7 km || 
|-id=499 bgcolor=#fefefe
| 329499 ||  || — || September 8, 2002 || Campo Imperatore || CINEOS || V || align=right data-sort-value="0.80" | 800 m || 
|-id=500 bgcolor=#d6d6d6
| 329500 ||  || — || September 9, 2002 || Palomar || NEAT || — || align=right | 5.9 km || 
|}

329501–329600 

|-bgcolor=#fefefe
| 329501 ||  || — || September 10, 2002 || Palomar || NEAT || V || align=right data-sort-value="0.78" | 780 m || 
|-id=502 bgcolor=#FA8072
| 329502 ||  || — || September 13, 2002 || Socorro || LINEAR || PHO || align=right | 1.3 km || 
|-id=503 bgcolor=#d6d6d6
| 329503 ||  || — || September 10, 2002 || Palomar || NEAT || — || align=right | 4.6 km || 
|-id=504 bgcolor=#d6d6d6
| 329504 ||  || — || September 11, 2002 || Palomar || NEAT || VER || align=right | 4.3 km || 
|-id=505 bgcolor=#d6d6d6
| 329505 ||  || — || September 12, 2002 || Palomar || NEAT || — || align=right | 3.3 km || 
|-id=506 bgcolor=#d6d6d6
| 329506 ||  || — || September 12, 2002 || Palomar || NEAT || — || align=right | 2.8 km || 
|-id=507 bgcolor=#d6d6d6
| 329507 ||  || — || September 13, 2002 || Palomar || NEAT || ALA || align=right | 4.2 km || 
|-id=508 bgcolor=#d6d6d6
| 329508 ||  || — || September 13, 2002 || Palomar || NEAT || ELF || align=right | 4.8 km || 
|-id=509 bgcolor=#d6d6d6
| 329509 ||  || — || September 11, 2002 || Palomar || NEAT || — || align=right | 5.7 km || 
|-id=510 bgcolor=#d6d6d6
| 329510 ||  || — || September 12, 2002 || Palomar || NEAT || — || align=right | 2.9 km || 
|-id=511 bgcolor=#d6d6d6
| 329511 ||  || — || September 12, 2002 || Palomar || NEAT || — || align=right | 4.4 km || 
|-id=512 bgcolor=#d6d6d6
| 329512 ||  || — || September 13, 2002 || Socorro || LINEAR || — || align=right | 3.8 km || 
|-id=513 bgcolor=#fefefe
| 329513 ||  || — || September 14, 2002 || Haleakala || NEAT || — || align=right data-sort-value="0.87" | 870 m || 
|-id=514 bgcolor=#E9E9E9
| 329514 ||  || — || September 15, 2002 || Palomar || R. Matson || — || align=right data-sort-value="0.86" | 860 m || 
|-id=515 bgcolor=#d6d6d6
| 329515 ||  || — || August 12, 2002 || Socorro || LINEAR || — || align=right | 4.1 km || 
|-id=516 bgcolor=#d6d6d6
| 329516 ||  || — || September 3, 2002 || Palomar || NEAT || — || align=right | 3.9 km || 
|-id=517 bgcolor=#d6d6d6
| 329517 ||  || — || September 4, 2002 || Palomar || NEAT || — || align=right | 2.7 km || 
|-id=518 bgcolor=#fefefe
| 329518 ||  || — || September 28, 2006 || Mount Lemmon || Mount Lemmon Survey || — || align=right data-sort-value="0.92" | 920 m || 
|-id=519 bgcolor=#fefefe
| 329519 ||  || — || November 15, 2006 || Socorro || LINEAR || — || align=right | 1.3 km || 
|-id=520 bgcolor=#FFC2E0
| 329520 ||  || — || September 23, 2002 || Haleakala || NEAT || AMO || align=right data-sort-value="0.39" | 390 m || 
|-id=521 bgcolor=#d6d6d6
| 329521 ||  || — || September 15, 2002 || Palomar || NEAT || — || align=right | 2.8 km || 
|-id=522 bgcolor=#fefefe
| 329522 ||  || — || September 28, 2002 || Haleakala || NEAT || — || align=right | 1.0 km || 
|-id=523 bgcolor=#fefefe
| 329523 ||  || — || September 30, 2002 || Socorro || LINEAR || — || align=right data-sort-value="0.77" | 770 m || 
|-id=524 bgcolor=#fefefe
| 329524 ||  || — || October 1, 2002 || Anderson Mesa || LONEOS || V || align=right data-sort-value="0.88" | 880 m || 
|-id=525 bgcolor=#fefefe
| 329525 ||  || — || October 1, 2002 || Haleakala || NEAT || — || align=right data-sort-value="0.98" | 980 m || 
|-id=526 bgcolor=#fefefe
| 329526 ||  || — || October 2, 2002 || Socorro || LINEAR || H || align=right data-sort-value="0.56" | 560 m || 
|-id=527 bgcolor=#fefefe
| 329527 ||  || — || October 1, 2002 || Anderson Mesa || LONEOS || V || align=right data-sort-value="0.91" | 910 m || 
|-id=528 bgcolor=#fefefe
| 329528 ||  || — || October 2, 2002 || Socorro || LINEAR || — || align=right data-sort-value="0.87" | 870 m || 
|-id=529 bgcolor=#fefefe
| 329529 ||  || — || October 2, 2002 || Socorro || LINEAR || NYS || align=right data-sort-value="0.76" | 760 m || 
|-id=530 bgcolor=#fefefe
| 329530 ||  || — || October 2, 2002 || Socorro || LINEAR || V || align=right data-sort-value="0.92" | 920 m || 
|-id=531 bgcolor=#d6d6d6
| 329531 ||  || — || October 2, 2002 || Socorro || LINEAR || — || align=right | 3.9 km || 
|-id=532 bgcolor=#d6d6d6
| 329532 ||  || — || October 2, 2002 || Socorro || LINEAR || — || align=right | 3.8 km || 
|-id=533 bgcolor=#d6d6d6
| 329533 ||  || — || October 2, 2002 || Socorro || LINEAR || THB || align=right | 3.6 km || 
|-id=534 bgcolor=#d6d6d6
| 329534 ||  || — || October 1, 2002 || Anderson Mesa || LONEOS || — || align=right | 3.6 km || 
|-id=535 bgcolor=#d6d6d6
| 329535 ||  || — || October 3, 2002 || Campo Imperatore || CINEOS || — || align=right | 4.5 km || 
|-id=536 bgcolor=#d6d6d6
| 329536 ||  || — || October 3, 2002 || Palomar || NEAT || — || align=right | 4.1 km || 
|-id=537 bgcolor=#d6d6d6
| 329537 ||  || — || October 1, 2002 || Haleakala || NEAT || — || align=right | 3.2 km || 
|-id=538 bgcolor=#d6d6d6
| 329538 ||  || — || October 3, 2002 || Palomar || NEAT || — || align=right | 5.5 km || 
|-id=539 bgcolor=#d6d6d6
| 329539 ||  || — || September 29, 2002 || Haleakala || NEAT || — || align=right | 3.9 km || 
|-id=540 bgcolor=#fefefe
| 329540 ||  || — || October 5, 2002 || Palomar || NEAT || H || align=right data-sort-value="0.78" | 780 m || 
|-id=541 bgcolor=#fefefe
| 329541 ||  || — || October 4, 2002 || Socorro || LINEAR || ERI || align=right | 2.0 km || 
|-id=542 bgcolor=#d6d6d6
| 329542 ||  || — || October 5, 2002 || Socorro || LINEAR || — || align=right | 4.4 km || 
|-id=543 bgcolor=#d6d6d6
| 329543 ||  || — || October 7, 2002 || Palomar || NEAT || — || align=right | 3.8 km || 
|-id=544 bgcolor=#fefefe
| 329544 ||  || — || October 7, 2002 || Haleakala || NEAT || H || align=right data-sort-value="0.74" | 740 m || 
|-id=545 bgcolor=#d6d6d6
| 329545 ||  || — || October 9, 2002 || Socorro || LINEAR || — || align=right | 3.3 km || 
|-id=546 bgcolor=#d6d6d6
| 329546 ||  || — || October 10, 2002 || Socorro || LINEAR || — || align=right | 5.7 km || 
|-id=547 bgcolor=#d6d6d6
| 329547 ||  || — || October 10, 2002 || Socorro || LINEAR || — || align=right | 6.4 km || 
|-id=548 bgcolor=#d6d6d6
| 329548 ||  || — || October 11, 2002 || Socorro || LINEAR || MEL || align=right | 4.0 km || 
|-id=549 bgcolor=#fefefe
| 329549 ||  || — || October 5, 2002 || Apache Point || SDSS || FLO || align=right data-sort-value="0.73" | 730 m || 
|-id=550 bgcolor=#d6d6d6
| 329550 ||  || — || October 5, 2002 || Apache Point || SDSS || HYG || align=right | 3.3 km || 
|-id=551 bgcolor=#fefefe
| 329551 ||  || — || October 10, 2002 || Apache Point || SDSS || V || align=right data-sort-value="0.53" | 530 m || 
|-id=552 bgcolor=#fefefe
| 329552 ||  || — || October 7, 2002 || Haleakala || NEAT || — || align=right | 1.1 km || 
|-id=553 bgcolor=#d6d6d6
| 329553 ||  || — || October 4, 2002 || Palomar || NEAT || THM || align=right | 2.2 km || 
|-id=554 bgcolor=#fefefe
| 329554 ||  || — || October 9, 2002 || Palomar || NEAT || — || align=right data-sort-value="0.56" | 560 m || 
|-id=555 bgcolor=#FA8072
| 329555 ||  || — || October 28, 2002 || Socorro || LINEAR || PHO || align=right | 1.5 km || 
|-id=556 bgcolor=#FA8072
| 329556 ||  || — || October 30, 2002 || Socorro || LINEAR || PHO || align=right | 1.7 km || 
|-id=557 bgcolor=#d6d6d6
| 329557 ||  || — || October 11, 2002 || Socorro || LINEAR || URS || align=right | 4.2 km || 
|-id=558 bgcolor=#d6d6d6
| 329558 ||  || — || October 28, 2002 || Haleakala || NEAT || MEL || align=right | 6.7 km || 
|-id=559 bgcolor=#fefefe
| 329559 ||  || — || October 28, 2002 || Palomar || NEAT || — || align=right | 1.3 km || 
|-id=560 bgcolor=#d6d6d6
| 329560 ||  || — || October 30, 2002 || Apache Point || SDSS || — || align=right | 4.0 km || 
|-id=561 bgcolor=#d6d6d6
| 329561 ||  || — || October 30, 2002 || Apache Point || SDSS || — || align=right | 3.9 km || 
|-id=562 bgcolor=#fefefe
| 329562 ||  || — || October 31, 2002 || Palomar || NEAT || — || align=right data-sort-value="0.85" | 850 m || 
|-id=563 bgcolor=#E9E9E9
| 329563 ||  || — || October 4, 2006 || Mount Lemmon || Mount Lemmon Survey || — || align=right | 1.2 km || 
|-id=564 bgcolor=#fefefe
| 329564 ||  || — || November 5, 2002 || Socorro || LINEAR || PHO || align=right | 2.4 km || 
|-id=565 bgcolor=#fefefe
| 329565 ||  || — || November 5, 2002 || Socorro || LINEAR || NYS || align=right data-sort-value="0.81" | 810 m || 
|-id=566 bgcolor=#E9E9E9
| 329566 ||  || — || November 5, 2002 || Palomar || NEAT || — || align=right data-sort-value="0.98" | 980 m || 
|-id=567 bgcolor=#fefefe
| 329567 ||  || — || November 6, 2002 || Haleakala || NEAT || — || align=right | 1.1 km || 
|-id=568 bgcolor=#d6d6d6
| 329568 ||  || — || November 6, 2002 || Socorro || LINEAR || EUP || align=right | 6.3 km || 
|-id=569 bgcolor=#fefefe
| 329569 ||  || — || November 6, 2002 || Haleakala || NEAT || — || align=right data-sort-value="0.97" | 970 m || 
|-id=570 bgcolor=#fefefe
| 329570 ||  || — || October 30, 2002 || Haleakala || NEAT || — || align=right data-sort-value="0.92" | 920 m || 
|-id=571 bgcolor=#FFC2E0
| 329571 ||  || — || November 13, 2002 || Socorro || LINEAR || AMO || align=right data-sort-value="0.61" | 610 m || 
|-id=572 bgcolor=#fefefe
| 329572 ||  || — || November 12, 2002 || Socorro || LINEAR || — || align=right | 1.0 km || 
|-id=573 bgcolor=#fefefe
| 329573 ||  || — || October 4, 2002 || Campo Imperatore || CINEOS || NYS || align=right data-sort-value="0.82" | 820 m || 
|-id=574 bgcolor=#fefefe
| 329574 ||  || — || November 1, 2002 || La Palma || La Palma Obs. || V || align=right data-sort-value="0.64" | 640 m || 
|-id=575 bgcolor=#d6d6d6
| 329575 ||  || — || November 13, 2002 || Xinglong || SCAP || 7:4 || align=right | 4.2 km || 
|-id=576 bgcolor=#fefefe
| 329576 ||  || — || November 12, 2002 || Palomar || NEAT || — || align=right | 2.4 km || 
|-id=577 bgcolor=#fefefe
| 329577 ||  || — || November 5, 2002 || Palomar || NEAT || H || align=right data-sort-value="0.61" | 610 m || 
|-id=578 bgcolor=#fefefe
| 329578 ||  || — || November 4, 2002 || Palomar || NEAT || NYS || align=right data-sort-value="0.69" | 690 m || 
|-id=579 bgcolor=#fefefe
| 329579 ||  || — || November 28, 2002 || Anderson Mesa || LONEOS || V || align=right data-sort-value="0.92" | 920 m || 
|-id=580 bgcolor=#C2FFFF
| 329580 ||  || — || November 24, 2002 || Palomar || NEAT || L5 || align=right | 12 km || 
|-id=581 bgcolor=#E9E9E9
| 329581 ||  || — || December 6, 2002 || Socorro || LINEAR || — || align=right | 1.8 km || 
|-id=582 bgcolor=#E9E9E9
| 329582 ||  || — || December 6, 2002 || Socorro || LINEAR || — || align=right | 1.4 km || 
|-id=583 bgcolor=#E9E9E9
| 329583 ||  || — || December 11, 2002 || Socorro || LINEAR || — || align=right | 1.5 km || 
|-id=584 bgcolor=#E9E9E9
| 329584 ||  || — || December 5, 2002 || Socorro || LINEAR || — || align=right | 1.3 km || 
|-id=585 bgcolor=#E9E9E9
| 329585 ||  || — || December 5, 2002 || Socorro || LINEAR || — || align=right | 1.1 km || 
|-id=586 bgcolor=#fefefe
| 329586 ||  || — || December 10, 2002 || Palomar || NEAT || NYS || align=right data-sort-value="0.73" | 730 m || 
|-id=587 bgcolor=#E9E9E9
| 329587 ||  || — || January 1, 2003 || Socorro || LINEAR || — || align=right | 1.3 km || 
|-id=588 bgcolor=#E9E9E9
| 329588 ||  || — || January 7, 2003 || Socorro || LINEAR || — || align=right | 1.4 km || 
|-id=589 bgcolor=#E9E9E9
| 329589 ||  || — || January 26, 2003 || Anderson Mesa || LONEOS || — || align=right | 1.4 km || 
|-id=590 bgcolor=#E9E9E9
| 329590 ||  || — || January 26, 2003 || Anderson Mesa || LONEOS || — || align=right | 1.5 km || 
|-id=591 bgcolor=#fefefe
| 329591 ||  || — || January 27, 2003 || Haleakala || NEAT || H || align=right data-sort-value="0.82" | 820 m || 
|-id=592 bgcolor=#E9E9E9
| 329592 ||  || — || January 27, 2003 || Socorro || LINEAR || — || align=right | 1.4 km || 
|-id=593 bgcolor=#E9E9E9
| 329593 ||  || — || January 27, 2003 || Socorro || LINEAR || — || align=right | 1.4 km || 
|-id=594 bgcolor=#E9E9E9
| 329594 ||  || — || January 29, 2003 || Palomar || NEAT || EUN || align=right | 1.6 km || 
|-id=595 bgcolor=#E9E9E9
| 329595 ||  || — || January 31, 2003 || Socorro || LINEAR || — || align=right | 1.9 km || 
|-id=596 bgcolor=#E9E9E9
| 329596 ||  || — || February 7, 2003 || Desert Eagle || W. K. Y. Yeung || — || align=right | 1.2 km || 
|-id=597 bgcolor=#E9E9E9
| 329597 ||  || — || February 1, 2003 || Palomar || NEAT || EUN || align=right | 1.8 km || 
|-id=598 bgcolor=#E9E9E9
| 329598 ||  || — || February 24, 2003 || Campo Imperatore || CINEOS || — || align=right | 1.2 km || 
|-id=599 bgcolor=#E9E9E9
| 329599 ||  || — || March 8, 2003 || Anderson Mesa || LONEOS || — || align=right | 2.0 km || 
|-id=600 bgcolor=#E9E9E9
| 329600 ||  || — || March 30, 2003 || Piszkéstető || K. Sárneczky || — || align=right | 1.3 km || 
|}

329601–329700 

|-bgcolor=#E9E9E9
| 329601 ||  || — || March 26, 2003 || Kitt Peak || Spacewatch || — || align=right | 1.5 km || 
|-id=602 bgcolor=#E9E9E9
| 329602 ||  || — || March 29, 2003 || Anderson Mesa || LONEOS || JUN || align=right | 1.4 km || 
|-id=603 bgcolor=#E9E9E9
| 329603 ||  || — || March 25, 2003 || Palomar || NEAT || — || align=right | 2.4 km || 
|-id=604 bgcolor=#E9E9E9
| 329604 ||  || — || March 31, 2003 || Socorro || LINEAR || ADE || align=right | 3.6 km || 
|-id=605 bgcolor=#E9E9E9
| 329605 ||  || — || March 31, 2003 || Socorro || LINEAR || BAR || align=right | 1.6 km || 
|-id=606 bgcolor=#E9E9E9
| 329606 ||  || — || March 24, 2003 || Kitt Peak || Spacewatch || — || align=right | 1.6 km || 
|-id=607 bgcolor=#E9E9E9
| 329607 ||  || — || April 2, 2003 || Haleakala || NEAT || — || align=right | 2.1 km || 
|-id=608 bgcolor=#E9E9E9
| 329608 ||  || — || April 8, 2003 || Kvistaberg || UDAS || ADE || align=right | 2.6 km || 
|-id=609 bgcolor=#E9E9E9
| 329609 ||  || — || April 6, 2003 || Anderson Mesa || LONEOS || — || align=right | 2.2 km || 
|-id=610 bgcolor=#fefefe
| 329610 ||  || — || April 3, 2003 || Anderson Mesa || LONEOS || — || align=right data-sort-value="0.74" | 740 m || 
|-id=611 bgcolor=#E9E9E9
| 329611 ||  || — || April 24, 2003 || Kitt Peak || Spacewatch || — || align=right | 1.7 km || 
|-id=612 bgcolor=#E9E9E9
| 329612 ||  || — || May 1, 2003 || Socorro || LINEAR || — || align=right | 3.1 km || 
|-id=613 bgcolor=#E9E9E9
| 329613 ||  || — || May 11, 2003 || Socorro || LINEAR || PAL || align=right | 4.4 km || 
|-id=614 bgcolor=#FFC2E0
| 329614 ||  || — || May 22, 2003 || Kitt Peak || Spacewatch || APO +1kmPHA || align=right | 1.1 km || 
|-id=615 bgcolor=#FA8072
| 329615 ||  || — || June 3, 2003 || Socorro || LINEAR || — || align=right data-sort-value="0.53" | 530 m || 
|-id=616 bgcolor=#fefefe
| 329616 ||  || — || July 22, 2003 || Haleakala || NEAT || — || align=right data-sort-value="0.94" | 940 m || 
|-id=617 bgcolor=#d6d6d6
| 329617 ||  || — || July 23, 2003 || Palomar || NEAT || — || align=right | 3.8 km || 
|-id=618 bgcolor=#fefefe
| 329618 ||  || — || July 29, 2003 || Reedy Creek || J. Broughton || — || align=right data-sort-value="0.74" | 740 m || 
|-id=619 bgcolor=#FA8072
| 329619 ||  || — || July 30, 2003 || Socorro || LINEAR || — || align=right | 3.7 km || 
|-id=620 bgcolor=#d6d6d6
| 329620 ||  || — || July 22, 2003 || Palomar || NEAT || — || align=right | 4.1 km || 
|-id=621 bgcolor=#d6d6d6
| 329621 ||  || — || August 18, 2003 || Campo Imperatore || CINEOS || EMA || align=right | 3.9 km || 
|-id=622 bgcolor=#E9E9E9
| 329622 ||  || — || August 22, 2003 || Palomar || NEAT || — || align=right | 1.9 km || 
|-id=623 bgcolor=#d6d6d6
| 329623 ||  || — || August 28, 2003 || Haleakala || NEAT || — || align=right | 2.7 km || 
|-id=624 bgcolor=#d6d6d6
| 329624 ||  || — || August 31, 2003 || Socorro || LINEAR || — || align=right | 5.1 km || 
|-id=625 bgcolor=#d6d6d6
| 329625 ||  || — || August 30, 2003 || Socorro || LINEAR || — || align=right | 4.0 km || 
|-id=626 bgcolor=#E9E9E9
| 329626 ||  || — || September 14, 2003 || Haleakala || NEAT || MRX || align=right | 1.4 km || 
|-id=627 bgcolor=#d6d6d6
| 329627 ||  || — || September 15, 2003 || Palomar || NEAT || — || align=right | 4.3 km || 
|-id=628 bgcolor=#d6d6d6
| 329628 ||  || — || September 18, 2003 || Kitt Peak || Spacewatch || — || align=right | 4.9 km || 
|-id=629 bgcolor=#fefefe
| 329629 ||  || — || September 16, 2003 || Anderson Mesa || LONEOS || — || align=right data-sort-value="0.89" | 890 m || 
|-id=630 bgcolor=#d6d6d6
| 329630 ||  || — || September 16, 2003 || Anderson Mesa || LONEOS || — || align=right | 2.9 km || 
|-id=631 bgcolor=#d6d6d6
| 329631 ||  || — || September 18, 2003 || Palomar || NEAT || EOS || align=right | 2.7 km || 
|-id=632 bgcolor=#fefefe
| 329632 ||  || — || August 31, 2003 || Haleakala || NEAT || — || align=right | 1.1 km || 
|-id=633 bgcolor=#d6d6d6
| 329633 ||  || — || September 17, 2003 || Kitt Peak || Spacewatch || — || align=right | 5.2 km || 
|-id=634 bgcolor=#d6d6d6
| 329634 ||  || — || September 16, 2003 || Palomar || NEAT || TIR || align=right | 3.3 km || 
|-id=635 bgcolor=#d6d6d6
| 329635 ||  || — || September 18, 2003 || Palomar || NEAT || — || align=right | 3.7 km || 
|-id=636 bgcolor=#fefefe
| 329636 ||  || — || September 21, 2003 || Kitt Peak || Spacewatch || FLO || align=right data-sort-value="0.71" | 710 m || 
|-id=637 bgcolor=#d6d6d6
| 329637 ||  || — || September 19, 2003 || Andrushivka || Andrushivka Obs. || YAK || align=right | 2.8 km || 
|-id=638 bgcolor=#d6d6d6
| 329638 ||  || — || September 19, 2003 || Campo Imperatore || CINEOS || — || align=right | 3.1 km || 
|-id=639 bgcolor=#d6d6d6
| 329639 ||  || — || September 18, 2003 || Haleakala || NEAT || — || align=right | 3.4 km || 
|-id=640 bgcolor=#d6d6d6
| 329640 ||  || — || September 19, 2003 || Kitt Peak || Spacewatch || EOS || align=right | 2.8 km || 
|-id=641 bgcolor=#d6d6d6
| 329641 ||  || — || September 17, 2003 || Palomar || NEAT || — || align=right | 3.1 km || 
|-id=642 bgcolor=#d6d6d6
| 329642 ||  || — || September 18, 2003 || Campo Imperatore || CINEOS || — || align=right | 3.2 km || 
|-id=643 bgcolor=#d6d6d6
| 329643 ||  || — || September 18, 2003 || Kitt Peak || Spacewatch || — || align=right | 2.7 km || 
|-id=644 bgcolor=#fefefe
| 329644 ||  || — || September 18, 2003 || Palomar || NEAT || — || align=right data-sort-value="0.82" | 820 m || 
|-id=645 bgcolor=#fefefe
| 329645 ||  || — || September 19, 2003 || Palomar || NEAT || — || align=right | 1.1 km || 
|-id=646 bgcolor=#d6d6d6
| 329646 ||  || — || September 18, 2003 || Palomar || NEAT || EOS || align=right | 3.1 km || 
|-id=647 bgcolor=#d6d6d6
| 329647 ||  || — || September 20, 2003 || Campo Imperatore || CINEOS || LIX || align=right | 4.1 km || 
|-id=648 bgcolor=#d6d6d6
| 329648 ||  || — || September 27, 2003 || Desert Eagle || W. K. Y. Yeung || — || align=right | 3.0 km || 
|-id=649 bgcolor=#fefefe
| 329649 ||  || — || September 27, 2003 || Kitt Peak || Spacewatch || MAS || align=right data-sort-value="0.64" | 640 m || 
|-id=650 bgcolor=#d6d6d6
| 329650 ||  || — || September 26, 2003 || Socorro || LINEAR || INA || align=right | 4.3 km || 
|-id=651 bgcolor=#d6d6d6
| 329651 ||  || — || September 19, 2003 || Palomar || NEAT || — || align=right | 5.3 km || 
|-id=652 bgcolor=#d6d6d6
| 329652 ||  || — || September 20, 2003 || Socorro || LINEAR || — || align=right | 4.1 km || 
|-id=653 bgcolor=#d6d6d6
| 329653 ||  || — || September 20, 2003 || Kitt Peak || Spacewatch || — || align=right | 3.8 km || 
|-id=654 bgcolor=#d6d6d6
| 329654 ||  || — || September 20, 2003 || Anderson Mesa || LONEOS || EOS || align=right | 2.6 km || 
|-id=655 bgcolor=#fefefe
| 329655 ||  || — || September 28, 2003 || Socorro || LINEAR || — || align=right data-sort-value="0.78" | 780 m || 
|-id=656 bgcolor=#fefefe
| 329656 ||  || — || September 21, 2003 || Palomar || NEAT || FLO || align=right data-sort-value="0.97" | 970 m || 
|-id=657 bgcolor=#d6d6d6
| 329657 ||  || — || September 18, 2003 || Kitt Peak || Spacewatch || — || align=right | 2.9 km || 
|-id=658 bgcolor=#d6d6d6
| 329658 ||  || — || September 26, 2003 || Apache Point || SDSS || EOS || align=right | 2.0 km || 
|-id=659 bgcolor=#fefefe
| 329659 ||  || — || September 26, 2003 || Apache Point || SDSS || — || align=right data-sort-value="0.67" | 670 m || 
|-id=660 bgcolor=#d6d6d6
| 329660 ||  || — || September 26, 2003 || Apache Point || SDSS || EMA || align=right | 4.0 km || 
|-id=661 bgcolor=#fefefe
| 329661 ||  || — || September 26, 2003 || Apache Point || SDSS || — || align=right data-sort-value="0.74" | 740 m || 
|-id=662 bgcolor=#d6d6d6
| 329662 ||  || — || September 26, 2003 || Apache Point || SDSS || — || align=right | 2.6 km || 
|-id=663 bgcolor=#d6d6d6
| 329663 ||  || — || September 28, 2003 || Apache Point || SDSS || — || align=right | 2.4 km || 
|-id=664 bgcolor=#d6d6d6
| 329664 ||  || — || October 5, 2003 || Kitt Peak || Spacewatch || — || align=right | 5.8 km || 
|-id=665 bgcolor=#d6d6d6
| 329665 ||  || — || October 1, 2003 || Kitt Peak || Spacewatch || — || align=right | 4.8 km || 
|-id=666 bgcolor=#d6d6d6
| 329666 ||  || — || October 1, 2003 || Kitt Peak || Spacewatch || — || align=right | 3.8 km || 
|-id=667 bgcolor=#d6d6d6
| 329667 ||  || — || October 2, 2003 || Kitt Peak || Spacewatch || EOS || align=right | 2.4 km || 
|-id=668 bgcolor=#d6d6d6
| 329668 ||  || — || October 5, 2003 || Kitt Peak || Spacewatch || — || align=right | 3.1 km || 
|-id=669 bgcolor=#FFC2E0
| 329669 ||  || — || October 18, 2003 || Socorro || LINEAR || AMO +1km || align=right | 1.6 km || 
|-id=670 bgcolor=#d6d6d6
| 329670 ||  || — || October 16, 2003 || Anderson Mesa || LONEOS || — || align=right | 2.9 km || 
|-id=671 bgcolor=#d6d6d6
| 329671 ||  || — || October 20, 2003 || Palomar || NEAT || — || align=right | 4.4 km || 
|-id=672 bgcolor=#d6d6d6
| 329672 ||  || — || October 23, 2003 || Goodricke-Pigott || R. A. Tucker || — || align=right | 4.3 km || 
|-id=673 bgcolor=#d6d6d6
| 329673 ||  || — || October 16, 2003 || Kitt Peak || Spacewatch || — || align=right | 3.4 km || 
|-id=674 bgcolor=#d6d6d6
| 329674 ||  || — || October 16, 2003 || Palomar || NEAT || — || align=right | 5.9 km || 
|-id=675 bgcolor=#fefefe
| 329675 ||  || — || October 16, 2003 || Anderson Mesa || LONEOS || FLO || align=right data-sort-value="0.75" | 750 m || 
|-id=676 bgcolor=#fefefe
| 329676 ||  || — || September 20, 2003 || Kitt Peak || Spacewatch || V || align=right data-sort-value="0.67" | 670 m || 
|-id=677 bgcolor=#d6d6d6
| 329677 ||  || — || October 20, 2003 || Kitt Peak || Spacewatch || — || align=right | 3.8 km || 
|-id=678 bgcolor=#d6d6d6
| 329678 ||  || — || October 20, 2003 || Kitt Peak || Spacewatch || — || align=right | 5.1 km || 
|-id=679 bgcolor=#fefefe
| 329679 ||  || — || October 16, 2003 || Anderson Mesa || LONEOS || — || align=right data-sort-value="0.87" | 870 m || 
|-id=680 bgcolor=#fefefe
| 329680 ||  || — || October 22, 2003 || Socorro || LINEAR || — || align=right | 1.1 km || 
|-id=681 bgcolor=#d6d6d6
| 329681 ||  || — || October 21, 2003 || Palomar || NEAT || THM || align=right | 2.9 km || 
|-id=682 bgcolor=#d6d6d6
| 329682 ||  || — || October 19, 2003 || Kitt Peak || Spacewatch || EOS || align=right | 3.1 km || 
|-id=683 bgcolor=#d6d6d6
| 329683 ||  || — || September 19, 2003 || Kitt Peak || Spacewatch || — || align=right | 2.9 km || 
|-id=684 bgcolor=#d6d6d6
| 329684 ||  || — || October 21, 2003 || Socorro || LINEAR || EOS || align=right | 2.4 km || 
|-id=685 bgcolor=#d6d6d6
| 329685 ||  || — || October 22, 2003 || Kitt Peak || Spacewatch || EOS || align=right | 2.6 km || 
|-id=686 bgcolor=#d6d6d6
| 329686 ||  || — || October 21, 2003 || Kitt Peak || Spacewatch || BRA || align=right | 1.9 km || 
|-id=687 bgcolor=#d6d6d6
| 329687 ||  || — || October 21, 2003 || Anderson Mesa || LONEOS || EOS || align=right | 2.7 km || 
|-id=688 bgcolor=#d6d6d6
| 329688 ||  || — || October 21, 2003 || Socorro || LINEAR || — || align=right | 3.1 km || 
|-id=689 bgcolor=#d6d6d6
| 329689 ||  || — || October 21, 2003 || Socorro || LINEAR || — || align=right | 3.8 km || 
|-id=690 bgcolor=#d6d6d6
| 329690 ||  || — || October 21, 2003 || Kitt Peak || Spacewatch || — || align=right | 5.3 km || 
|-id=691 bgcolor=#d6d6d6
| 329691 ||  || — || October 23, 2003 || Kitt Peak || Spacewatch || — || align=right | 4.7 km || 
|-id=692 bgcolor=#d6d6d6
| 329692 ||  || — || October 21, 2003 || Kitt Peak || Spacewatch || — || align=right | 3.6 km || 
|-id=693 bgcolor=#d6d6d6
| 329693 ||  || — || October 23, 2003 || Kitt Peak || Spacewatch || — || align=right | 3.4 km || 
|-id=694 bgcolor=#d6d6d6
| 329694 ||  || — || October 23, 2003 || Kitt Peak || Spacewatch || EOS || align=right | 2.6 km || 
|-id=695 bgcolor=#d6d6d6
| 329695 ||  || — || October 24, 2003 || Socorro || LINEAR || THM || align=right | 2.4 km || 
|-id=696 bgcolor=#fefefe
| 329696 ||  || — || October 19, 2003 || Palomar || NEAT || — || align=right | 1.2 km || 
|-id=697 bgcolor=#d6d6d6
| 329697 ||  || — || October 25, 2003 || Kitt Peak || Spacewatch || — || align=right | 3.3 km || 
|-id=698 bgcolor=#d6d6d6
| 329698 ||  || — || October 28, 2003 || Socorro || LINEAR || — || align=right | 5.8 km || 
|-id=699 bgcolor=#fefefe
| 329699 ||  || — || October 28, 2003 || Socorro || LINEAR || FLO || align=right data-sort-value="0.70" | 700 m || 
|-id=700 bgcolor=#d6d6d6
| 329700 ||  || — || October 29, 2003 || Socorro || LINEAR || EOS || align=right | 2.7 km || 
|}

329701–329800 

|-bgcolor=#d6d6d6
| 329701 ||  || — || October 29, 2003 || Socorro || LINEAR || — || align=right | 3.6 km || 
|-id=702 bgcolor=#d6d6d6
| 329702 ||  || — || October 30, 2003 || Socorro || LINEAR || — || align=right | 4.2 km || 
|-id=703 bgcolor=#fefefe
| 329703 ||  || — || October 29, 2003 || Socorro || LINEAR || — || align=right | 1.1 km || 
|-id=704 bgcolor=#d6d6d6
| 329704 ||  || — || October 23, 2003 || Kitt Peak || M. W. Buie || EMA || align=right | 3.8 km || 
|-id=705 bgcolor=#d6d6d6
| 329705 ||  || — || October 16, 2003 || Kitt Peak || Spacewatch || KOR || align=right | 1.4 km || 
|-id=706 bgcolor=#d6d6d6
| 329706 ||  || — || September 22, 2003 || Palomar || NEAT || — || align=right | 3.3 km || 
|-id=707 bgcolor=#fefefe
| 329707 ||  || — || October 19, 2003 || Apache Point || SDSS || — || align=right data-sort-value="0.72" | 720 m || 
|-id=708 bgcolor=#fefefe
| 329708 ||  || — || October 19, 2003 || Apache Point || SDSS || — || align=right data-sort-value="0.68" | 680 m || 
|-id=709 bgcolor=#d6d6d6
| 329709 ||  || — || October 22, 2003 || Apache Point || SDSS || — || align=right | 2.8 km || 
|-id=710 bgcolor=#d6d6d6
| 329710 ||  || — || October 22, 2003 || Apache Point || SDSS || HYG || align=right | 3.1 km || 
|-id=711 bgcolor=#d6d6d6
| 329711 ||  || — || October 22, 2003 || Apache Point || SDSS || — || align=right | 3.1 km || 
|-id=712 bgcolor=#d6d6d6
| 329712 ||  || — || November 18, 2003 || Palomar || NEAT || — || align=right | 5.2 km || 
|-id=713 bgcolor=#FFC2E0
| 329713 ||  || — || November 18, 2003 || Kitt Peak || Spacewatch || AMO || align=right data-sort-value="0.62" | 620 m || 
|-id=714 bgcolor=#fefefe
| 329714 ||  || — || November 18, 2003 || Kitt Peak || Spacewatch || — || align=right data-sort-value="0.97" | 970 m || 
|-id=715 bgcolor=#d6d6d6
| 329715 ||  || — || November 18, 2003 || Kitt Peak || Spacewatch || HYG || align=right | 3.2 km || 
|-id=716 bgcolor=#fefefe
| 329716 ||  || — || November 19, 2003 || Kitt Peak || Spacewatch || — || align=right | 1.1 km || 
|-id=717 bgcolor=#d6d6d6
| 329717 ||  || — || November 19, 2003 || Kitt Peak || Spacewatch || — || align=right | 3.6 km || 
|-id=718 bgcolor=#fefefe
| 329718 ||  || — || November 19, 2003 || Anderson Mesa || LONEOS || — || align=right data-sort-value="0.74" | 740 m || 
|-id=719 bgcolor=#fefefe
| 329719 ||  || — || November 21, 2003 || Socorro || LINEAR || NYS || align=right data-sort-value="0.66" | 660 m || 
|-id=720 bgcolor=#d6d6d6
| 329720 ||  || — || November 23, 2003 || Socorro || LINEAR || — || align=right | 5.0 km || 
|-id=721 bgcolor=#d6d6d6
| 329721 ||  || — || November 20, 2003 || Socorro || LINEAR || EOS || align=right | 3.0 km || 
|-id=722 bgcolor=#fefefe
| 329722 ||  || — || November 20, 2003 || Socorro || LINEAR || — || align=right | 1.1 km || 
|-id=723 bgcolor=#d6d6d6
| 329723 ||  || — || November 2, 2003 || Socorro || LINEAR || — || align=right | 3.6 km || 
|-id=724 bgcolor=#fefefe
| 329724 ||  || — || November 23, 2003 || Kitt Peak || Spacewatch || FLO || align=right data-sort-value="0.73" | 730 m || 
|-id=725 bgcolor=#fefefe
| 329725 ||  || — || November 24, 2003 || Anderson Mesa || LONEOS || — || align=right | 1.0 km || 
|-id=726 bgcolor=#d6d6d6
| 329726 ||  || — || November 30, 2003 || Kitt Peak || Spacewatch || — || align=right | 3.3 km || 
|-id=727 bgcolor=#fefefe
| 329727 ||  || — || November 19, 2003 || Palomar || NEAT || — || align=right data-sort-value="0.85" | 850 m || 
|-id=728 bgcolor=#d6d6d6
| 329728 ||  || — || November 21, 2003 || Palomar || NEAT || — || align=right | 4.8 km || 
|-id=729 bgcolor=#fefefe
| 329729 ||  || — || December 1, 2003 || Socorro || LINEAR || — || align=right | 1.0 km || 
|-id=730 bgcolor=#d6d6d6
| 329730 ||  || — || December 14, 2003 || Palomar || NEAT || — || align=right | 3.8 km || 
|-id=731 bgcolor=#d6d6d6
| 329731 ||  || — || December 14, 2003 || Kitt Peak || Spacewatch || EOS || align=right | 2.7 km || 
|-id=732 bgcolor=#d6d6d6
| 329732 ||  || — || December 1, 2003 || Kitt Peak || Spacewatch || — || align=right | 3.8 km || 
|-id=733 bgcolor=#fefefe
| 329733 ||  || — || December 17, 2003 || Kitt Peak || Spacewatch || NYS || align=right data-sort-value="0.87" | 870 m || 
|-id=734 bgcolor=#fefefe
| 329734 ||  || — || December 18, 2003 || Socorro || LINEAR || — || align=right data-sort-value="0.93" | 930 m || 
|-id=735 bgcolor=#d6d6d6
| 329735 ||  || — || December 17, 2003 || Palomar || NEAT || — || align=right | 3.2 km || 
|-id=736 bgcolor=#fefefe
| 329736 ||  || — || December 19, 2003 || Socorro || LINEAR || — || align=right data-sort-value="0.97" | 970 m || 
|-id=737 bgcolor=#fefefe
| 329737 ||  || — || December 19, 2003 || Socorro || LINEAR || NYS || align=right data-sort-value="0.84" | 840 m || 
|-id=738 bgcolor=#fefefe
| 329738 ||  || — || December 19, 2003 || Kitt Peak || Spacewatch || — || align=right | 1.1 km || 
|-id=739 bgcolor=#d6d6d6
| 329739 ||  || — || December 21, 2003 || Socorro || LINEAR || EUP || align=right | 6.0 km || 
|-id=740 bgcolor=#d6d6d6
| 329740 ||  || — || December 17, 2003 || Wrightwood || J. W. Young || EUP || align=right | 4.8 km || 
|-id=741 bgcolor=#E9E9E9
| 329741 ||  || — || December 17, 2003 || Anderson Mesa || LONEOS || — || align=right | 1.3 km || 
|-id=742 bgcolor=#fefefe
| 329742 ||  || — || January 13, 2004 || Anderson Mesa || LONEOS || NYS || align=right data-sort-value="0.71" | 710 m || 
|-id=743 bgcolor=#fefefe
| 329743 ||  || — || January 19, 2004 || Kitt Peak || Spacewatch || MAS || align=right | 1.0 km || 
|-id=744 bgcolor=#fefefe
| 329744 ||  || — || January 19, 2004 || Kitt Peak || Spacewatch || — || align=right data-sort-value="0.88" | 880 m || 
|-id=745 bgcolor=#fefefe
| 329745 ||  || — || January 19, 2004 || Kitt Peak || Spacewatch || MAS || align=right data-sort-value="0.73" | 730 m || 
|-id=746 bgcolor=#fefefe
| 329746 ||  || — || January 22, 2004 || Socorro || LINEAR || V || align=right data-sort-value="0.88" | 880 m || 
|-id=747 bgcolor=#fefefe
| 329747 ||  || — || January 24, 2004 || Socorro || LINEAR || PHO || align=right | 4.1 km || 
|-id=748 bgcolor=#fefefe
| 329748 ||  || — || January 26, 2004 || Anderson Mesa || LONEOS || — || align=right | 1.3 km || 
|-id=749 bgcolor=#fefefe
| 329749 ||  || — || January 16, 2004 || Kitt Peak || Spacewatch || — || align=right data-sort-value="0.63" | 630 m || 
|-id=750 bgcolor=#fefefe
| 329750 ||  || — || February 10, 2004 || Palomar || NEAT || FLO || align=right | 1.0 km || 
|-id=751 bgcolor=#fefefe
| 329751 ||  || — || February 13, 2004 || Kitt Peak || Spacewatch || — || align=right data-sort-value="0.83" | 830 m || 
|-id=752 bgcolor=#E9E9E9
| 329752 ||  || — || February 13, 2004 || Kitt Peak || Spacewatch || — || align=right | 1.2 km || 
|-id=753 bgcolor=#fefefe
| 329753 ||  || — || February 13, 2004 || Desert Eagle || W. K. Y. Yeung || PHO || align=right | 1.2 km || 
|-id=754 bgcolor=#fefefe
| 329754 ||  || — || February 16, 2004 || Kitt Peak || Spacewatch || — || align=right data-sort-value="0.89" | 890 m || 
|-id=755 bgcolor=#fefefe
| 329755 ||  || — || March 11, 2004 || Palomar || NEAT || NYS || align=right | 1.0 km || 
|-id=756 bgcolor=#fefefe
| 329756 ||  || — || March 14, 2004 || Kitt Peak || Spacewatch || — || align=right | 1.2 km || 
|-id=757 bgcolor=#fefefe
| 329757 ||  || — || March 15, 2004 || Socorro || LINEAR || H || align=right data-sort-value="0.89" | 890 m || 
|-id=758 bgcolor=#fefefe
| 329758 ||  || — || March 15, 2004 || Kitt Peak || Spacewatch || critical || align=right data-sort-value="0.54" | 540 m || 
|-id=759 bgcolor=#fefefe
| 329759 ||  || — || March 15, 2004 || Socorro || LINEAR || V || align=right data-sort-value="0.82" | 820 m || 
|-id=760 bgcolor=#fefefe
| 329760 ||  || — || March 15, 2004 || Kitt Peak || Spacewatch || MAS || align=right data-sort-value="0.68" | 680 m || 
|-id=761 bgcolor=#fefefe
| 329761 ||  || — || March 18, 2004 || Socorro || LINEAR || — || align=right | 1.00 km || 
|-id=762 bgcolor=#fefefe
| 329762 ||  || — || March 19, 2004 || Palomar || NEAT || NYS || align=right data-sort-value="0.87" | 870 m || 
|-id=763 bgcolor=#fefefe
| 329763 ||  || — || March 22, 2004 || Socorro || LINEAR || MAS || align=right data-sort-value="0.97" | 970 m || 
|-id=764 bgcolor=#fefefe
| 329764 ||  || — || February 13, 2004 || Kitt Peak || Spacewatch || — || align=right data-sort-value="0.90" | 900 m || 
|-id=765 bgcolor=#fefefe
| 329765 ||  || — || March 21, 2004 || Kitt Peak || Spacewatch || — || align=right data-sort-value="0.95" | 950 m || 
|-id=766 bgcolor=#fefefe
| 329766 ||  || — || March 17, 2004 || Kitt Peak || Spacewatch || MAS || align=right data-sort-value="0.68" | 680 m || 
|-id=767 bgcolor=#fefefe
| 329767 ||  || — || April 14, 2004 || Kitt Peak || Spacewatch || NYS || align=right data-sort-value="0.69" | 690 m || 
|-id=768 bgcolor=#fefefe
| 329768 ||  || — || April 13, 2004 || Kitt Peak || Spacewatch || MAS || align=right data-sort-value="0.76" | 760 m || 
|-id=769 bgcolor=#E9E9E9
| 329769 ||  || — || April 19, 2004 || Socorro || LINEAR || EUN || align=right | 1.1 km || 
|-id=770 bgcolor=#FFC2E0
| 329770 ||  || — || May 1, 2004 || Socorro || LINEAR || APO +1km || align=right data-sort-value="0.94" | 940 m || 
|-id=771 bgcolor=#fefefe
| 329771 ||  || — || May 12, 2004 || Catalina || CSS || — || align=right | 1.6 km || 
|-id=772 bgcolor=#E9E9E9
| 329772 ||  || — || May 15, 2004 || Socorro || LINEAR || — || align=right | 1.3 km || 
|-id=773 bgcolor=#fefefe
| 329773 ||  || — || May 14, 2004 || Kitt Peak || Spacewatch || H || align=right data-sort-value="0.62" | 620 m || 
|-id=774 bgcolor=#FFC2E0
| 329774 ||  || — || June 8, 2004 || Socorro || LINEAR || APO +1km || align=right | 1.6 km || 
|-id=775 bgcolor=#fefefe
| 329775 ||  || — || June 12, 2004 || Socorro || LINEAR || H || align=right data-sort-value="0.59" | 590 m || 
|-id=776 bgcolor=#FA8072
| 329776 ||  || — || June 12, 2004 || Socorro || LINEAR || H || align=right | 1.0 km || 
|-id=777 bgcolor=#E9E9E9
| 329777 ||  || — || June 11, 2004 || Kitt Peak || Spacewatch || — || align=right | 1.1 km || 
|-id=778 bgcolor=#E9E9E9
| 329778 ||  || — || June 22, 2004 || Wrightwood || J. W. Young || — || align=right | 2.0 km || 
|-id=779 bgcolor=#E9E9E9
| 329779 ||  || — || June 29, 2004 || Siding Spring || SSS || — || align=right | 2.6 km || 
|-id=780 bgcolor=#E9E9E9
| 329780 ||  || — || July 10, 2004 || Catalina || CSS || ADE || align=right | 2.9 km || 
|-id=781 bgcolor=#E9E9E9
| 329781 ||  || — || July 11, 2004 || Socorro || LINEAR || — || align=right | 1.3 km || 
|-id=782 bgcolor=#E9E9E9
| 329782 ||  || — || July 14, 2004 || Socorro || LINEAR || — || align=right | 2.0 km || 
|-id=783 bgcolor=#E9E9E9
| 329783 ||  || — || July 14, 2004 || Socorro || LINEAR || — || align=right | 4.7 km || 
|-id=784 bgcolor=#E9E9E9
| 329784 ||  || — || July 5, 2004 || Campo Imperatore || CINEOS || — || align=right | 1.2 km || 
|-id=785 bgcolor=#E9E9E9
| 329785 ||  || — || July 13, 2004 || Siding Spring || SSS || BRG || align=right | 2.2 km || 
|-id=786 bgcolor=#E9E9E9
| 329786 ||  || — || August 8, 2004 || Campo Imperatore || CINEOS || — || align=right | 2.3 km || 
|-id=787 bgcolor=#E9E9E9
| 329787 ||  || — || August 6, 2004 || Palomar || NEAT || critical || align=right data-sort-value="0.94" | 940 m || 
|-id=788 bgcolor=#E9E9E9
| 329788 ||  || — || August 8, 2004 || Socorro || LINEAR || — || align=right | 1.7 km || 
|-id=789 bgcolor=#E9E9E9
| 329789 ||  || — || August 8, 2004 || Socorro || LINEAR || EUN || align=right | 1.6 km || 
|-id=790 bgcolor=#E9E9E9
| 329790 ||  || — || August 9, 2004 || Siding Spring || SSS || EUN || align=right | 1.3 km || 
|-id=791 bgcolor=#E9E9E9
| 329791 ||  || — || August 9, 2004 || Anderson Mesa || LONEOS || — || align=right | 1.5 km || 
|-id=792 bgcolor=#E9E9E9
| 329792 ||  || — || August 9, 2004 || Anderson Mesa || LONEOS || AER || align=right | 1.6 km || 
|-id=793 bgcolor=#E9E9E9
| 329793 ||  || — || August 10, 2004 || Socorro || LINEAR || EUN || align=right | 1.1 km || 
|-id=794 bgcolor=#E9E9E9
| 329794 ||  || — || August 12, 2004 || Socorro || LINEAR || — || align=right | 1.7 km || 
|-id=795 bgcolor=#E9E9E9
| 329795 ||  || — || August 12, 2004 || Socorro || LINEAR || — || align=right | 2.0 km || 
|-id=796 bgcolor=#fefefe
| 329796 ||  || — || August 11, 2004 || Palomar || NEAT || H || align=right data-sort-value="0.87" | 870 m || 
|-id=797 bgcolor=#E9E9E9
| 329797 ||  || — || August 14, 2004 || Palomar || NEAT || — || align=right data-sort-value="0.95" | 950 m || 
|-id=798 bgcolor=#E9E9E9
| 329798 ||  || — || August 20, 2004 || Kitt Peak || Spacewatch || — || align=right | 2.3 km || 
|-id=799 bgcolor=#E9E9E9
| 329799 ||  || — || August 16, 2004 || Palomar || NEAT || — || align=right | 1.2 km || 
|-id=800 bgcolor=#E9E9E9
| 329800 ||  || — || August 20, 2004 || Kitt Peak || Spacewatch || — || align=right | 1.2 km || 
|}

329801–329900 

|-bgcolor=#E9E9E9
| 329801 ||  || — || August 21, 2004 || Catalina || CSS || GEF || align=right | 1.6 km || 
|-id=802 bgcolor=#E9E9E9
| 329802 ||  || — || August 20, 2004 || Socorro || LINEAR || PAL || align=right | 3.6 km || 
|-id=803 bgcolor=#fefefe
| 329803 ||  || — || August 22, 2004 || Kitt Peak || Spacewatch || — || align=right data-sort-value="0.78" | 780 m || 
|-id=804 bgcolor=#E9E9E9
| 329804 ||  || — || September 5, 2004 || Palomar || NEAT || — || align=right | 1.7 km || 
|-id=805 bgcolor=#E9E9E9
| 329805 ||  || — || September 6, 2004 || Kvistaberg || UDAS || ADE || align=right | 2.4 km || 
|-id=806 bgcolor=#E9E9E9
| 329806 ||  || — || September 8, 2004 || Socorro || LINEAR || JUN || align=right | 1.0 km || 
|-id=807 bgcolor=#E9E9E9
| 329807 ||  || — || September 8, 2004 || Socorro || LINEAR || NEM || align=right | 2.8 km || 
|-id=808 bgcolor=#E9E9E9
| 329808 ||  || — || September 8, 2004 || Socorro || LINEAR || — || align=right data-sort-value="0.96" | 960 m || 
|-id=809 bgcolor=#E9E9E9
| 329809 ||  || — || September 8, 2004 || Socorro || LINEAR || MIS || align=right | 3.0 km || 
|-id=810 bgcolor=#E9E9E9
| 329810 ||  || — || September 7, 2004 || Socorro || LINEAR || ADE || align=right | 2.8 km || 
|-id=811 bgcolor=#E9E9E9
| 329811 ||  || — || September 8, 2004 || Socorro || LINEAR || — || align=right | 1.5 km || 
|-id=812 bgcolor=#E9E9E9
| 329812 ||  || — || September 8, 2004 || Socorro || LINEAR || RAF || align=right | 1.2 km || 
|-id=813 bgcolor=#E9E9E9
| 329813 ||  || — || September 8, 2004 || Socorro || LINEAR || MAR || align=right | 1.3 km || 
|-id=814 bgcolor=#E9E9E9
| 329814 ||  || — || September 8, 2004 || Socorro || LINEAR || EUN || align=right | 1.4 km || 
|-id=815 bgcolor=#E9E9E9
| 329815 ||  || — || September 7, 2004 || Kitt Peak || Spacewatch || AGN || align=right | 1.0 km || 
|-id=816 bgcolor=#E9E9E9
| 329816 ||  || — || September 8, 2004 || Campo Imperatore || CINEOS || — || align=right | 2.5 km || 
|-id=817 bgcolor=#E9E9E9
| 329817 ||  || — || September 8, 2004 || Socorro || LINEAR || — || align=right | 2.3 km || 
|-id=818 bgcolor=#E9E9E9
| 329818 ||  || — || September 9, 2004 || Socorro || LINEAR || NEM || align=right | 3.0 km || 
|-id=819 bgcolor=#E9E9E9
| 329819 ||  || — || September 10, 2004 || Socorro || LINEAR || — || align=right | 3.6 km || 
|-id=820 bgcolor=#E9E9E9
| 329820 ||  || — || September 10, 2004 || Socorro || LINEAR || GEF || align=right | 1.3 km || 
|-id=821 bgcolor=#E9E9E9
| 329821 ||  || — || September 10, 2004 || Kitt Peak || Spacewatch || — || align=right | 2.4 km || 
|-id=822 bgcolor=#E9E9E9
| 329822 ||  || — || September 10, 2004 || Socorro || LINEAR || — || align=right | 2.1 km || 
|-id=823 bgcolor=#E9E9E9
| 329823 ||  || — || September 10, 2004 || Socorro || LINEAR || — || align=right | 2.0 km || 
|-id=824 bgcolor=#E9E9E9
| 329824 ||  || — || September 10, 2004 || Socorro || LINEAR || TIN || align=right | 1.2 km || 
|-id=825 bgcolor=#E9E9E9
| 329825 ||  || — || September 11, 2004 || Socorro || LINEAR || — || align=right | 2.5 km || 
|-id=826 bgcolor=#E9E9E9
| 329826 ||  || — || September 8, 2004 || Campo Imperatore || CINEOS || — || align=right | 3.2 km || 
|-id=827 bgcolor=#E9E9E9
| 329827 ||  || — || September 10, 2004 || Kitt Peak || Spacewatch || — || align=right | 2.7 km || 
|-id=828 bgcolor=#d6d6d6
| 329828 ||  || — || September 10, 2004 || Kitt Peak || Spacewatch || — || align=right | 2.8 km || 
|-id=829 bgcolor=#E9E9E9
| 329829 ||  || — || September 10, 2004 || Socorro || LINEAR || — || align=right | 2.3 km || 
|-id=830 bgcolor=#E9E9E9
| 329830 ||  || — || September 13, 2004 || Socorro || LINEAR || — || align=right | 3.6 km || 
|-id=831 bgcolor=#E9E9E9
| 329831 ||  || — || September 13, 2004 || Socorro || LINEAR || — || align=right | 5.7 km || 
|-id=832 bgcolor=#E9E9E9
| 329832 ||  || — || September 13, 2004 || Palomar || NEAT || — || align=right | 2.0 km || 
|-id=833 bgcolor=#E9E9E9
| 329833 ||  || — || September 11, 2004 || Socorro || LINEAR || — || align=right | 2.5 km || 
|-id=834 bgcolor=#E9E9E9
| 329834 ||  || — || September 13, 2004 || Socorro || LINEAR || — || align=right | 2.9 km || 
|-id=835 bgcolor=#E9E9E9
| 329835 ||  || — || September 16, 2004 || Siding Spring || SSS || — || align=right | 4.3 km || 
|-id=836 bgcolor=#E9E9E9
| 329836 ||  || — || September 17, 2004 || Anderson Mesa || LONEOS || GEF || align=right | 1.9 km || 
|-id=837 bgcolor=#E9E9E9
| 329837 ||  || — || September 18, 2004 || Socorro || LINEAR || NEM || align=right | 2.8 km || 
|-id=838 bgcolor=#FA8072
| 329838 ||  || — || September 16, 2004 || Anderson Mesa || LONEOS || — || align=right | 1.5 km || 
|-id=839 bgcolor=#d6d6d6
| 329839 ||  || — || September 9, 2004 || Kitt Peak || Spacewatch || — || align=right | 2.4 km || 
|-id=840 bgcolor=#d6d6d6
| 329840 ||  || — || October 4, 2004 || Kitt Peak || Spacewatch || — || align=right | 3.3 km || 
|-id=841 bgcolor=#E9E9E9
| 329841 ||  || — || October 4, 2004 || Kitt Peak || Spacewatch || — || align=right | 2.9 km || 
|-id=842 bgcolor=#E9E9E9
| 329842 ||  || — || October 4, 2004 || Kitt Peak || Spacewatch || GEF || align=right | 1.9 km || 
|-id=843 bgcolor=#E9E9E9
| 329843 ||  || — || September 7, 2004 || Kitt Peak || Spacewatch || — || align=right | 2.6 km || 
|-id=844 bgcolor=#d6d6d6
| 329844 ||  || — || October 6, 2004 || Kitt Peak || Spacewatch || — || align=right | 2.2 km || 
|-id=845 bgcolor=#E9E9E9
| 329845 ||  || — || October 5, 2004 || Kitt Peak || Spacewatch || HOF || align=right | 2.5 km || 
|-id=846 bgcolor=#d6d6d6
| 329846 ||  || — || October 5, 2004 || Kitt Peak || Spacewatch || — || align=right | 2.2 km || 
|-id=847 bgcolor=#E9E9E9
| 329847 ||  || — || October 7, 2004 || Anderson Mesa || LONEOS || — || align=right | 2.9 km || 
|-id=848 bgcolor=#E9E9E9
| 329848 ||  || — || October 7, 2004 || Socorro || LINEAR || — || align=right | 3.3 km || 
|-id=849 bgcolor=#fefefe
| 329849 ||  || — || October 8, 2004 || Anderson Mesa || LONEOS || — || align=right data-sort-value="0.61" | 610 m || 
|-id=850 bgcolor=#d6d6d6
| 329850 ||  || — || October 7, 2004 || Kitt Peak || Spacewatch || — || align=right | 2.5 km || 
|-id=851 bgcolor=#d6d6d6
| 329851 ||  || — || October 7, 2004 || Kitt Peak || Spacewatch || KOR || align=right | 1.2 km || 
|-id=852 bgcolor=#E9E9E9
| 329852 ||  || — || October 7, 2004 || Socorro || LINEAR || JUN || align=right | 1.6 km || 
|-id=853 bgcolor=#E9E9E9
| 329853 ||  || — || October 9, 2004 || Socorro || LINEAR || — || align=right | 4.1 km || 
|-id=854 bgcolor=#E9E9E9
| 329854 ||  || — || October 10, 2004 || Kitt Peak || Spacewatch || — || align=right | 2.9 km || 
|-id=855 bgcolor=#E9E9E9
| 329855 ||  || — || October 10, 2004 || Socorro || LINEAR || — || align=right | 3.6 km || 
|-id=856 bgcolor=#E9E9E9
| 329856 ||  || — || October 14, 2004 || Anderson Mesa || LONEOS || EUN || align=right | 2.0 km || 
|-id=857 bgcolor=#d6d6d6
| 329857 ||  || — || October 7, 2004 || Kitt Peak || Spacewatch || — || align=right | 4.2 km || 
|-id=858 bgcolor=#E9E9E9
| 329858 ||  || — || November 5, 2004 || Palomar || NEAT || — || align=right | 4.0 km || 
|-id=859 bgcolor=#d6d6d6
| 329859 ||  || — || November 4, 2004 || Anderson Mesa || LONEOS || CHA || align=right | 2.8 km || 
|-id=860 bgcolor=#d6d6d6
| 329860 ||  || — || November 3, 2004 || Kitt Peak || Spacewatch || — || align=right | 5.1 km || 
|-id=861 bgcolor=#d6d6d6
| 329861 ||  || — || November 9, 2004 || Catalina || CSS || — || align=right | 4.1 km || 
|-id=862 bgcolor=#d6d6d6
| 329862 ||  || — || December 2, 2004 || Catalina || CSS || — || align=right | 3.2 km || 
|-id=863 bgcolor=#d6d6d6
| 329863 ||  || — || December 8, 2004 || Socorro || LINEAR || — || align=right | 4.8 km || 
|-id=864 bgcolor=#d6d6d6
| 329864 ||  || — || December 11, 2004 || Kitt Peak || Spacewatch || — || align=right | 2.7 km || 
|-id=865 bgcolor=#d6d6d6
| 329865 ||  || — || November 20, 2004 || Kitt Peak || Spacewatch || — || align=right | 3.7 km || 
|-id=866 bgcolor=#d6d6d6
| 329866 ||  || — || December 9, 2004 || Socorro || LINEAR || — || align=right | 3.7 km || 
|-id=867 bgcolor=#d6d6d6
| 329867 ||  || — || December 13, 2004 || Kitt Peak || Spacewatch || — || align=right | 2.8 km || 
|-id=868 bgcolor=#E9E9E9
| 329868 ||  || — || December 9, 2004 || Kitt Peak || Spacewatch || — || align=right | 5.2 km || 
|-id=869 bgcolor=#d6d6d6
| 329869 ||  || — || December 14, 2004 || Kitt Peak || Spacewatch || LIX || align=right | 3.4 km || 
|-id=870 bgcolor=#fefefe
| 329870 ||  || — || December 18, 2004 || Mount Lemmon || Mount Lemmon Survey || — || align=right data-sort-value="0.63" | 630 m || 
|-id=871 bgcolor=#d6d6d6
| 329871 ||  || — || January 1, 2005 || Catalina || CSS || EOS || align=right | 3.0 km || 
|-id=872 bgcolor=#d6d6d6
| 329872 ||  || — || January 6, 2005 || Socorro || LINEAR || — || align=right | 4.0 km || 
|-id=873 bgcolor=#d6d6d6
| 329873 ||  || — || January 6, 2005 || Catalina || CSS || EUP || align=right | 6.0 km || 
|-id=874 bgcolor=#d6d6d6
| 329874 ||  || — || January 6, 2005 || Socorro || LINEAR || — || align=right | 3.7 km || 
|-id=875 bgcolor=#d6d6d6
| 329875 ||  || — || January 13, 2005 || Catalina || CSS || — || align=right | 5.8 km || 
|-id=876 bgcolor=#d6d6d6
| 329876 ||  || — || January 19, 2005 || Wrightwood || J. W. Young || — || align=right | 3.2 km || 
|-id=877 bgcolor=#d6d6d6
| 329877 ||  || — || January 16, 2005 || Kitt Peak || Spacewatch || VER || align=right | 4.0 km || 
|-id=878 bgcolor=#fefefe
| 329878 ||  || — || January 16, 2005 || Bergisch Gladbac || Bergisch Gladbach Obs. || — || align=right data-sort-value="0.93" | 930 m || 
|-id=879 bgcolor=#d6d6d6
| 329879 ||  || — || January 13, 2005 || Socorro || LINEAR || — || align=right | 5.0 km || 
|-id=880 bgcolor=#fefefe
| 329880 ||  || — || February 1, 2005 || Kitt Peak || Spacewatch || — || align=right data-sort-value="0.75" | 750 m || 
|-id=881 bgcolor=#fefefe
| 329881 ||  || — || March 3, 2005 || Kitt Peak || Spacewatch || — || align=right data-sort-value="0.83" | 830 m || 
|-id=882 bgcolor=#fefefe
| 329882 ||  || — || March 3, 2005 || Catalina || CSS || — || align=right data-sort-value="0.80" | 800 m || 
|-id=883 bgcolor=#d6d6d6
| 329883 ||  || — || March 4, 2005 || Mount Lemmon || Mount Lemmon Survey || HYG || align=right | 3.2 km || 
|-id=884 bgcolor=#fefefe
| 329884 ||  || — || March 10, 2005 || Mount Lemmon || Mount Lemmon Survey || — || align=right data-sort-value="0.90" | 900 m || 
|-id=885 bgcolor=#fefefe
| 329885 ||  || — || March 10, 2005 || Kitt Peak || Spacewatch || FLO || align=right data-sort-value="0.68" | 680 m || 
|-id=886 bgcolor=#fefefe
| 329886 ||  || — || March 4, 2005 || Kitt Peak || Spacewatch || — || align=right data-sort-value="0.83" | 830 m || 
|-id=887 bgcolor=#fefefe
| 329887 ||  || — || March 9, 2005 || Mount Lemmon || Mount Lemmon Survey || — || align=right | 1.1 km || 
|-id=888 bgcolor=#fefefe
| 329888 ||  || — || March 10, 2005 || Mount Lemmon || Mount Lemmon Survey || FLO || align=right data-sort-value="0.67" | 670 m || 
|-id=889 bgcolor=#fefefe
| 329889 ||  || — || March 12, 2005 || Kitt Peak || Spacewatch || — || align=right data-sort-value="0.67" | 670 m || 
|-id=890 bgcolor=#fefefe
| 329890 ||  || — || March 11, 2005 || Kitt Peak || Spacewatch || — || align=right | 1.00 km || 
|-id=891 bgcolor=#fefefe
| 329891 ||  || — || April 1, 2005 || Kitt Peak || Spacewatch || — || align=right data-sort-value="0.77" | 770 m || 
|-id=892 bgcolor=#fefefe
| 329892 ||  || — || April 4, 2005 || Catalina || CSS || FLO || align=right data-sort-value="0.91" | 910 m || 
|-id=893 bgcolor=#fefefe
| 329893 ||  || — || April 2, 2005 || Mount Lemmon || Mount Lemmon Survey || — || align=right data-sort-value="0.83" | 830 m || 
|-id=894 bgcolor=#fefefe
| 329894 ||  || — || November 24, 2003 || Kitt Peak || Spacewatch || FLO || align=right data-sort-value="0.80" | 800 m || 
|-id=895 bgcolor=#fefefe
| 329895 ||  || — || April 5, 2005 || Anderson Mesa || LONEOS || — || align=right data-sort-value="0.86" | 860 m || 
|-id=896 bgcolor=#fefefe
| 329896 ||  || — || April 10, 2005 || Mount Lemmon || Mount Lemmon Survey || V || align=right data-sort-value="0.75" | 750 m || 
|-id=897 bgcolor=#fefefe
| 329897 ||  || — || April 10, 2005 || Kitt Peak || Spacewatch || V || align=right data-sort-value="0.63" | 630 m || 
|-id=898 bgcolor=#fefefe
| 329898 ||  || — || April 11, 2005 || Kitt Peak || Spacewatch || — || align=right data-sort-value="0.82" | 820 m || 
|-id=899 bgcolor=#fefefe
| 329899 ||  || — || April 12, 2005 || Anderson Mesa || LONEOS || — || align=right data-sort-value="0.81" | 810 m || 
|-id=900 bgcolor=#fefefe
| 329900 ||  || — || April 30, 2005 || Kitt Peak || Spacewatch || V || align=right data-sort-value="0.70" | 700 m || 
|}

329901–330000 

|-bgcolor=#fefefe
| 329901 ||  || — || May 3, 2005 || Kitt Peak || Spacewatch || — || align=right | 1.2 km || 
|-id=902 bgcolor=#fefefe
| 329902 ||  || — || May 3, 2005 || Kitt Peak || Spacewatch || — || align=right data-sort-value="0.75" | 750 m || 
|-id=903 bgcolor=#fefefe
| 329903 ||  || — || May 8, 2005 || Kitt Peak || Spacewatch || — || align=right data-sort-value="0.94" | 940 m || 
|-id=904 bgcolor=#fefefe
| 329904 ||  || — || May 11, 2005 || Mount Lemmon || Mount Lemmon Survey || — || align=right data-sort-value="0.65" | 650 m || 
|-id=905 bgcolor=#fefefe
| 329905 ||  || — || May 9, 2005 || Kitt Peak || Spacewatch || V || align=right data-sort-value="0.57" | 570 m || 
|-id=906 bgcolor=#fefefe
| 329906 ||  || — || May 12, 2005 || Mount Lemmon || Mount Lemmon Survey || — || align=right data-sort-value="0.86" | 860 m || 
|-id=907 bgcolor=#fefefe
| 329907 ||  || — || May 9, 2005 || Mount Lemmon || Mount Lemmon Survey || — || align=right data-sort-value="0.77" | 770 m || 
|-id=908 bgcolor=#fefefe
| 329908 ||  || — || May 10, 2005 || Kitt Peak || Spacewatch || — || align=right data-sort-value="0.95" | 950 m || 
|-id=909 bgcolor=#fefefe
| 329909 ||  || — || May 10, 2005 || Kitt Peak || Spacewatch || — || align=right | 1.1 km || 
|-id=910 bgcolor=#fefefe
| 329910 ||  || — || May 3, 2005 || Catalina || CSS || PHO || align=right data-sort-value="0.97" | 970 m || 
|-id=911 bgcolor=#fefefe
| 329911 ||  || — || May 4, 2005 || Kitt Peak || Spacewatch || — || align=right data-sort-value="0.86" | 860 m || 
|-id=912 bgcolor=#fefefe
| 329912 ||  || — || June 6, 2005 || Siding Spring || SSS || ERI || align=right | 2.1 km || 
|-id=913 bgcolor=#fefefe
| 329913 ||  || — || June 6, 2005 || Kitt Peak || Spacewatch || — || align=right data-sort-value="0.83" | 830 m || 
|-id=914 bgcolor=#fefefe
| 329914 ||  || — || June 6, 2005 || Kitt Peak || Spacewatch || V || align=right data-sort-value="0.55" | 550 m || 
|-id=915 bgcolor=#FFC2E0
| 329915 ||  || — || June 16, 2005 || Siding Spring || SSS || ATE +1kmcritical || align=right | 1.0 km || 
|-id=916 bgcolor=#fefefe
| 329916 ||  || — || June 27, 2005 || Kitt Peak || Spacewatch || V || align=right data-sort-value="0.85" | 850 m || 
|-id=917 bgcolor=#fefefe
| 329917 ||  || — || June 30, 2005 || Kitt Peak || Spacewatch || — || align=right data-sort-value="0.90" | 900 m || 
|-id=918 bgcolor=#fefefe
| 329918 ||  || — || June 30, 2005 || Kitt Peak || Spacewatch || FLO || align=right data-sort-value="0.78" | 780 m || 
|-id=919 bgcolor=#d6d6d6
| 329919 ||  || — || June 30, 2005 || Kitt Peak || Spacewatch || HIL3:2 || align=right | 9.0 km || 
|-id=920 bgcolor=#fefefe
| 329920 ||  || — || July 2, 2005 || Kitt Peak || Spacewatch || — || align=right | 1.0 km || 
|-id=921 bgcolor=#d6d6d6
| 329921 ||  || — || July 4, 2005 || Palomar || NEAT || SHU3:2 || align=right | 7.6 km || 
|-id=922 bgcolor=#fefefe
| 329922 ||  || — || July 5, 2005 || Kitt Peak || Spacewatch || — || align=right | 1.0 km || 
|-id=923 bgcolor=#FA8072
| 329923 ||  || — || July 3, 2005 || Catalina || CSS || — || align=right | 1.4 km || 
|-id=924 bgcolor=#d6d6d6
| 329924 ||  || — || July 1, 2005 || Kitt Peak || Spacewatch || 3:2 || align=right | 4.7 km || 
|-id=925 bgcolor=#fefefe
| 329925 ||  || — || July 5, 2005 || Kitt Peak || Spacewatch || NYS || align=right data-sort-value="0.54" | 540 m || 
|-id=926 bgcolor=#E9E9E9
| 329926 ||  || — || July 6, 2005 || Kitt Peak || Spacewatch || — || align=right | 1.00 km || 
|-id=927 bgcolor=#d6d6d6
| 329927 ||  || — || July 11, 2005 || Kitt Peak || Spacewatch || SHU3:2 || align=right | 6.7 km || 
|-id=928 bgcolor=#E9E9E9
| 329928 ||  || — || July 9, 2005 || Kitt Peak || Spacewatch || — || align=right | 1.5 km || 
|-id=929 bgcolor=#fefefe
| 329929 ||  || — || July 8, 2005 || Kitt Peak || Spacewatch || V || align=right data-sort-value="0.67" | 670 m || 
|-id=930 bgcolor=#fefefe
| 329930 ||  || — || July 12, 2005 || Mount Lemmon || Mount Lemmon Survey || NYS || align=right data-sort-value="0.80" | 800 m || 
|-id=931 bgcolor=#fefefe
| 329931 ||  || — || July 28, 2005 || Palomar || NEAT || NYS || align=right data-sort-value="0.68" | 680 m || 
|-id=932 bgcolor=#fefefe
| 329932 ||  || — || July 28, 2005 || Palomar || NEAT || NYS || align=right data-sort-value="0.72" | 720 m || 
|-id=933 bgcolor=#fefefe
| 329933 ||  || — || July 28, 2005 || Palomar || NEAT || — || align=right data-sort-value="0.71" | 710 m || 
|-id=934 bgcolor=#fefefe
| 329934 ||  || — || July 27, 2005 || Reedy Creek || J. Broughton || V || align=right data-sort-value="0.82" | 820 m || 
|-id=935 bgcolor=#fefefe
| 329935 Prévôt ||  ||  || July 30, 2005 || Vicques || M. Ory || — || align=right data-sort-value="0.94" | 940 m || 
|-id=936 bgcolor=#fefefe
| 329936 ||  || — || July 28, 2005 || Palomar || NEAT || NYS || align=right data-sort-value="0.58" | 580 m || 
|-id=937 bgcolor=#fefefe
| 329937 ||  || — || August 6, 2005 || Socorro || LINEAR || — || align=right data-sort-value="0.89" | 890 m || 
|-id=938 bgcolor=#d6d6d6
| 329938 ||  || — || August 4, 2005 || Palomar || NEAT || 3:2 || align=right | 4.7 km || 
|-id=939 bgcolor=#d6d6d6
| 329939 ||  || — || August 3, 2005 || Needville || Needville Obs. || 3:2 || align=right | 4.4 km || 
|-id=940 bgcolor=#E9E9E9
| 329940 ||  || — || August 25, 2005 || Campo Imperatore || CINEOS || — || align=right | 1.8 km || 
|-id=941 bgcolor=#fefefe
| 329941 ||  || — || August 22, 2005 || Palomar || NEAT || FLO || align=right data-sort-value="0.80" | 800 m || 
|-id=942 bgcolor=#fefefe
| 329942 ||  || — || August 25, 2005 || Palomar || NEAT || SVE || align=right | 2.3 km || 
|-id=943 bgcolor=#fefefe
| 329943 ||  || — || August 25, 2005 || Palomar || NEAT || — || align=right data-sort-value="0.85" | 850 m || 
|-id=944 bgcolor=#fefefe
| 329944 ||  || — || August 29, 2005 || Anderson Mesa || LONEOS || NYS || align=right data-sort-value="0.68" | 680 m || 
|-id=945 bgcolor=#fefefe
| 329945 ||  || — || August 22, 2005 || Palomar || NEAT || — || align=right | 1.0 km || 
|-id=946 bgcolor=#fefefe
| 329946 ||  || — || August 25, 2005 || Palomar || NEAT || NYS || align=right data-sort-value="0.74" | 740 m || 
|-id=947 bgcolor=#fefefe
| 329947 ||  || — || August 26, 2005 || Campo Imperatore || CINEOS || MAS || align=right data-sort-value="0.85" | 850 m || 
|-id=948 bgcolor=#fefefe
| 329948 ||  || — || August 26, 2005 || Anderson Mesa || LONEOS || — || align=right | 1.1 km || 
|-id=949 bgcolor=#fefefe
| 329949 ||  || — || August 26, 2005 || Palomar || NEAT || NYS || align=right data-sort-value="0.69" | 690 m || 
|-id=950 bgcolor=#fefefe
| 329950 ||  || — || August 28, 2005 || Kitt Peak || Spacewatch || — || align=right data-sort-value="0.86" | 860 m || 
|-id=951 bgcolor=#fefefe
| 329951 ||  || — || August 24, 2005 || Siding Spring || SSS || — || align=right | 1.1 km || 
|-id=952 bgcolor=#fefefe
| 329952 ||  || — || August 26, 2005 || Palomar || NEAT || — || align=right data-sort-value="0.75" | 750 m || 
|-id=953 bgcolor=#fefefe
| 329953 ||  || — || August 26, 2005 || Palomar || NEAT || — || align=right data-sort-value="0.82" | 820 m || 
|-id=954 bgcolor=#fefefe
| 329954 ||  || — || August 29, 2005 || Socorro || LINEAR || NYS || align=right data-sort-value="0.66" | 660 m || 
|-id=955 bgcolor=#fefefe
| 329955 ||  || — || August 29, 2005 || Kitt Peak || Spacewatch || — || align=right | 1.1 km || 
|-id=956 bgcolor=#E9E9E9
| 329956 ||  || — || August 27, 2005 || Palomar || NEAT || — || align=right | 1.4 km || 
|-id=957 bgcolor=#E9E9E9
| 329957 ||  || — || August 27, 2005 || Palomar || NEAT || MAR || align=right | 1.0 km || 
|-id=958 bgcolor=#E9E9E9
| 329958 ||  || — || August 28, 2005 || Kitt Peak || Spacewatch || — || align=right | 3.5 km || 
|-id=959 bgcolor=#fefefe
| 329959 ||  || — || August 29, 2005 || Anderson Mesa || LONEOS || NYS || align=right data-sort-value="0.72" | 720 m || 
|-id=960 bgcolor=#E9E9E9
| 329960 ||  || — || January 29, 2003 || Apache Point || SDSS || — || align=right data-sort-value="0.75" | 750 m || 
|-id=961 bgcolor=#fefefe
| 329961 ||  || — || August 31, 2005 || Socorro || LINEAR || — || align=right | 1.0 km || 
|-id=962 bgcolor=#fefefe
| 329962 ||  || — || August 26, 2005 || Palomar || NEAT || NYS || align=right data-sort-value="0.76" | 760 m || 
|-id=963 bgcolor=#fefefe
| 329963 ||  || — || August 26, 2005 || Palomar || NEAT || — || align=right data-sort-value="0.94" | 940 m || 
|-id=964 bgcolor=#E9E9E9
| 329964 ||  || — || August 31, 2005 || Palomar || NEAT || — || align=right | 1.8 km || 
|-id=965 bgcolor=#E9E9E9
| 329965 ||  || — || September 1, 2005 || Kitt Peak || Spacewatch || — || align=right | 1.3 km || 
|-id=966 bgcolor=#E9E9E9
| 329966 ||  || — || September 14, 2005 || Socorro || LINEAR || EUN || align=right | 1.5 km || 
|-id=967 bgcolor=#E9E9E9
| 329967 ||  || — || September 24, 2005 || Anderson Mesa || LONEOS || — || align=right | 2.2 km || 
|-id=968 bgcolor=#fefefe
| 329968 ||  || — || September 23, 2005 || Kitt Peak || Spacewatch || — || align=right data-sort-value="0.99" | 990 m || 
|-id=969 bgcolor=#fefefe
| 329969 ||  || — || September 24, 2005 || Kitt Peak || Spacewatch || MAS || align=right data-sort-value="0.82" | 820 m || 
|-id=970 bgcolor=#E9E9E9
| 329970 ||  || — || September 24, 2005 || Kitt Peak || Spacewatch || — || align=right | 2.0 km || 
|-id=971 bgcolor=#fefefe
| 329971 ||  || — || September 27, 2005 || Socorro || LINEAR || — || align=right | 1.3 km || 
|-id=972 bgcolor=#fefefe
| 329972 ||  || — || September 24, 2005 || Kitt Peak || Spacewatch || — || align=right | 1.2 km || 
|-id=973 bgcolor=#E9E9E9
| 329973 ||  || — || September 24, 2005 || Kitt Peak || Spacewatch || — || align=right data-sort-value="0.88" | 880 m || 
|-id=974 bgcolor=#E9E9E9
| 329974 ||  || — || September 24, 2005 || Kitt Peak || Spacewatch || — || align=right | 1.1 km || 
|-id=975 bgcolor=#E9E9E9
| 329975 ||  || — || September 25, 2005 || Kitt Peak || Spacewatch || — || align=right | 1.5 km || 
|-id=976 bgcolor=#E9E9E9
| 329976 ||  || — || September 25, 2005 || Kitt Peak || Spacewatch || — || align=right | 2.5 km || 
|-id=977 bgcolor=#E9E9E9
| 329977 ||  || — || September 29, 2005 || Kitt Peak || Spacewatch || — || align=right | 1.9 km || 
|-id=978 bgcolor=#E9E9E9
| 329978 ||  || — || September 24, 2005 || Kitt Peak || Spacewatch || AGN || align=right | 1.0 km || 
|-id=979 bgcolor=#d6d6d6
| 329979 ||  || — || September 25, 2005 || Kitt Peak || Spacewatch || — || align=right | 2.0 km || 
|-id=980 bgcolor=#E9E9E9
| 329980 ||  || — || September 26, 2005 || Kitt Peak || Spacewatch || — || align=right | 1.6 km || 
|-id=981 bgcolor=#fefefe
| 329981 ||  || — || September 29, 2005 || Kitt Peak || Spacewatch || H || align=right data-sort-value="0.80" | 800 m || 
|-id=982 bgcolor=#E9E9E9
| 329982 ||  || — || September 29, 2005 || Kitt Peak || Spacewatch || — || align=right | 2.1 km || 
|-id=983 bgcolor=#E9E9E9
| 329983 ||  || — || September 30, 2005 || Mount Lemmon || Mount Lemmon Survey || — || align=right | 1.5 km || 
|-id=984 bgcolor=#fefefe
| 329984 ||  || — || September 30, 2005 || Kitt Peak || Spacewatch || MAS || align=right data-sort-value="0.76" | 760 m || 
|-id=985 bgcolor=#E9E9E9
| 329985 ||  || — || September 30, 2005 || Mount Lemmon || Mount Lemmon Survey || — || align=right | 1.4 km || 
|-id=986 bgcolor=#E9E9E9
| 329986 ||  || — || September 29, 2005 || Kitt Peak || Spacewatch || — || align=right | 1.0 km || 
|-id=987 bgcolor=#E9E9E9
| 329987 ||  || — || September 29, 2005 || Kitt Peak || Spacewatch || MAR || align=right | 1.4 km || 
|-id=988 bgcolor=#E9E9E9
| 329988 ||  || — || September 30, 2005 || Mount Lemmon || Mount Lemmon Survey || — || align=right data-sort-value="0.83" | 830 m || 
|-id=989 bgcolor=#E9E9E9
| 329989 ||  || — || September 29, 2005 || Kitt Peak || Spacewatch || — || align=right | 2.2 km || 
|-id=990 bgcolor=#E9E9E9
| 329990 ||  || — || September 21, 2005 || Apache Point || A. C. Becker || — || align=right data-sort-value="0.98" | 980 m || 
|-id=991 bgcolor=#E9E9E9
| 329991 ||  || — || October 1, 2005 || Mount Lemmon || Mount Lemmon Survey || — || align=right | 1.1 km || 
|-id=992 bgcolor=#E9E9E9
| 329992 ||  || — || October 11, 2005 || Uccle || P. De Cat || — || align=right | 2.0 km || 
|-id=993 bgcolor=#fefefe
| 329993 ||  || — || October 1, 2005 || Catalina || CSS || — || align=right | 1.4 km || 
|-id=994 bgcolor=#E9E9E9
| 329994 ||  || — || October 1, 2005 || Mount Lemmon || Mount Lemmon Survey || — || align=right | 1.3 km || 
|-id=995 bgcolor=#E9E9E9
| 329995 ||  || — || October 3, 2005 || Kitt Peak || Spacewatch || — || align=right | 2.4 km || 
|-id=996 bgcolor=#E9E9E9
| 329996 ||  || — || October 6, 2005 || Kitt Peak || Spacewatch || — || align=right | 2.2 km || 
|-id=997 bgcolor=#E9E9E9
| 329997 ||  || — || October 7, 2005 || Anderson Mesa || LONEOS || — || align=right | 1.2 km || 
|-id=998 bgcolor=#E9E9E9
| 329998 ||  || — || October 5, 2005 || Kitt Peak || Spacewatch || — || align=right data-sort-value="0.76" | 760 m || 
|-id=999 bgcolor=#E9E9E9
| 329999 ||  || — || October 6, 2005 || Anderson Mesa || LONEOS || — || align=right | 1.6 km || 
|-id=000 bgcolor=#E9E9E9
| 330000 ||  || — || October 6, 2005 || Kitt Peak || Spacewatch || MRX || align=right | 1.3 km || 
|}

References

External links 
 Discovery Circumstances: Numbered Minor Planets (325001)–(330000) (IAU Minor Planet Center)

0329